= Coachella Valley Radio Control Club =

U.S. model aircraft club

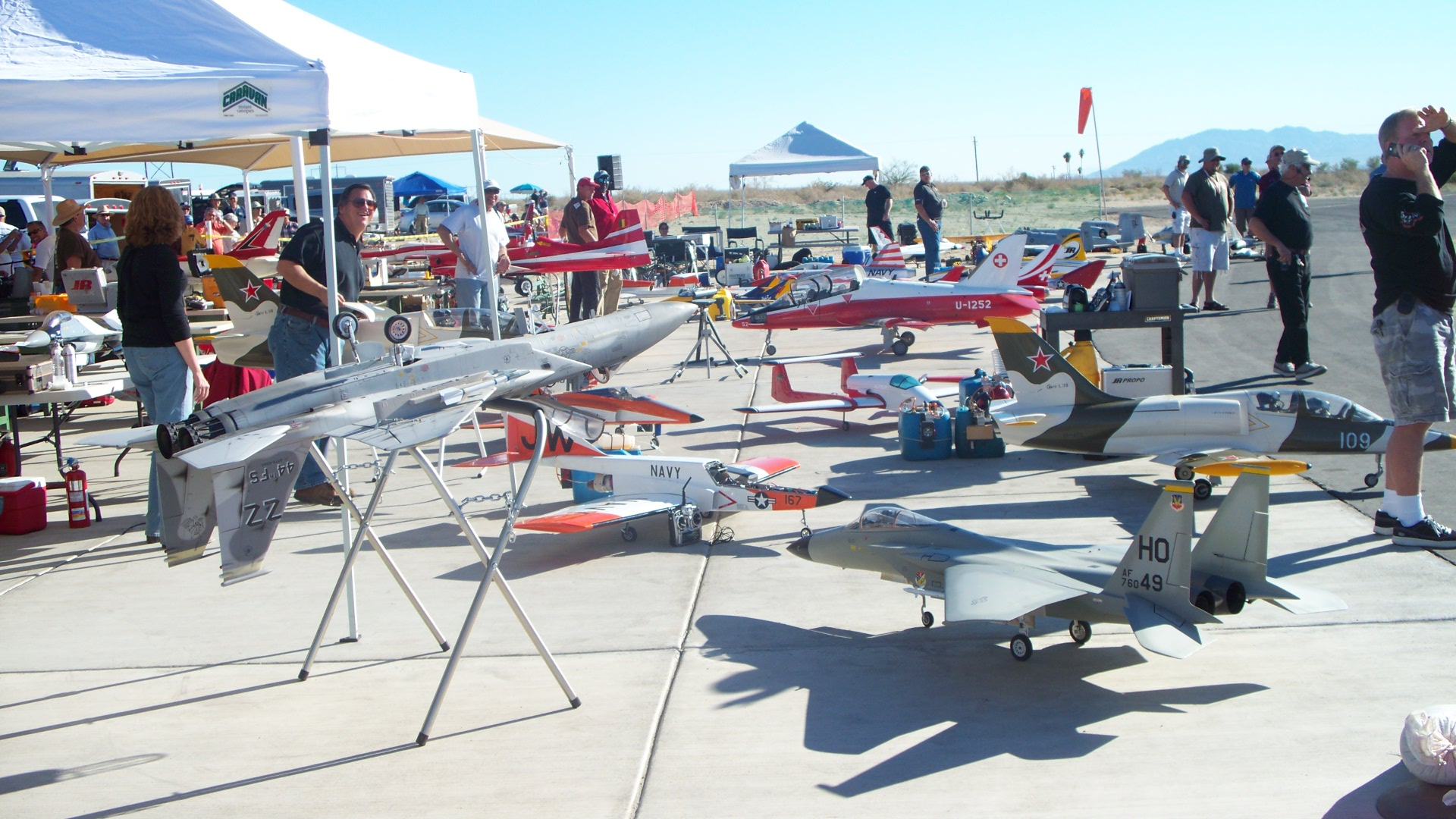
Pit area of the club during the 2009 "Best In The West" event. View is to the south

The Coachella Valley Radio Control Club is based near Coachella in Riverside County, California, United States. It is one of the oldest model aircraft clubs in the United States, one of the oldest non-profit service organizations in continuous existence in the Coachella Valley and one of the few Academy of Model Aeronautics gold-certified clubs in the country.

"Gold certification" means that the club has met certain strict guidelines of safety requirements within the AMA rules as well as a high degree of both safety and quality regarding the facility itself.

== Early history ==
The club traces its roots to 1938 when a loose-knit group of free flight model aircraft enthusiasts began meeting on a weekly basis at the now-defunct La Quinta Airport. That site, between Eisenhower Drive and Washington Street south of Avenue 52, is today a part of the La Quinta Cove residential district. It lies almost directly at the foot of the Santa Rosa Mountains, is prone to sudden high winds and, in the case of the hobbyists, the resulting loss of models.

The onset of World War II in 1941 brought the practice to a temporary halt, resuming after the war at other open sites around the area. The immediate postwar era would see three major developments in the hobby, namely the development of control line flying, small nitromethane-powered glow engines and early, single-channel radio control. The latter took advantage of another postwar development, that of citizen's band radio. Model aircraft were allocated only one frequency, 27.255 MHz, meaning only one plane could fly at any given time. These early advances insured that the club would continue to grow, with hobbyists meeting at almost any open area that was available at the time.

== Later development ==
By the early 1990s, the central and western areas of the Coachella Valley were growing at a record pace. Many of the club's previous flying fields were either built over or were considered private property. Finding areas that were free of interference from buildings and power lines was becoming increasingly more difficult. 1992 saw the club's move to their fifteenth official site with the lease of undeveloped land at Avenue 58 and Monroe Street in the unincorporated Vista Santa Rosa area.

On May 9, 1999, the club organized their first formal meeting in literally years to discuss its future. Presidency of the club was offered to Dan Metz, a radio control enthusiast who had flown with the club for fifteen years. Metz agreed to serve for the next three years, agreeing to step down if he was unable to procure a permanent site; he has since returned to his duties as president. Metz began by soliciting local municipal governments, but the areas offered had problems such as excessive wind, access problems and noise concerns. Another member, Ron Vincent, offered his help. Vincent had assisted in procuring land and building a site in his native Oregon and contacted the United States Bureau of Reclamation regarding the possible use of federal land. These sites had problems of their own, primarily because of Desert Bighorn Sheep Habitat incursion and encroachment on Native American land.

The Bureau eventually offered a site encompassing 240 acres (0.97 km^{2}) - or one square kilometer - alongside the All-American Canal in an unincorporated area off Avenue 54 and Pierce Street near Coachella. The site not only had ideal flying conditions, but an ideal arrangement as well with an initial twenty-five-year lease at only US$1 per year with renewal options for another twenty-five years at the lease's expiration.

Much work remained as the site was littered with garbage, wrecked automobiles and discarded tires. Metz began telling his story in earnest and before long, donations from developers and large corporations began coming in. Members donated money, furniture and the monumental amount of labor needed to clear and develop the site. Member Larry Eaks, a wheelchair user, actually drove the water truck necessary to reduce the amount of very fine particulate matter thrown into the air during construction.

The 600'x70' (183x21m) runway, pit area and parking area were completed in May 2002. Extensions added later brought the runway to its current length of 865' (263.65m). A combination control line and helicopter pad was added in late 2007 when the stretch of Avenue 54 leading to the property was paved by the county; the pad may also be used by slow-flying park flyers. A flagpole was added to the area next to the dedication plaque in 2008 and was dedicated with a flag which had flown over the United States Capitol and which was donated to the club by Congresswoman Mary Bono Mack. Since the club is located on public land, maintenance is conducted in part by the Coachella Valley Parks and Recreation Department. Other maintenance and operational costs are offset by annual dues of US$200.

== The club today ==
The Coachella Valley Radio Control Club as a 501(c)(3) organization works closely with the area's school districts via its "Delta Dart" program which teaches young children the basics of flight as well as the basis of model construction. Delta Darts, provided by the Academy of Model Aeronautics, are rubber band-powered free flight models made of balsa and are built over full-sized plans in the same manner as a larger model plane. A friendly competition is held to see whose Delta Dart will fly the farthest. Younger children can participate in the construction of "catapult gliders." These are made of sheet balsa stock and are more easily assembled. These are launched in much the same way as firing a slingshot, i.e., by attaching the nose of the glider to a rubber band on a wooden handle, pulling back and letting go. At the high school level, the club works with each school's ROTC program to promote careers in aviation and aeronautics and works closely with students who have demonstrated an interest in same. "Fun Flys" are held throughout the year, generally one Sunday per month; guests with no previous radio controlled flight experience can actually fly a large, easy to see and very stable model via a buddy box at that time. At least one Fun Fly near the end of the year is held as a fundraiser for Toys for Tots. As mentioned in the opening paragraph, the Coachella Valley Radio Control Club has been the site of the "Best In The West Jet Rally," a national meeting of model jet turbine enthusiasts which in turn receives national press coverage in Model Aviation, the monthly publication of the AMA. One of the most notable participants in the 2008 event was Colonel Robert E. Thacker, USAF (Ret.) who entered his F-15, capable of speeds up to 150 miles per hour (240 km/h). A 35 foot (11 m) extension was added to the north end of the runway and a 30 foot (9.1 m) extension added to the south end in January 2009 to better accommodate the "Best in the West" event.

The January 2009 running of the "Best in the West" saw national sponsorship for the first time. Sponsors included model manufacturers E-flite, Cermark and Century Jet Models along with modeling adhesives manufacturer Bob Smith Industries. Detailed coverage of the event appeared in the August 2009 edition of Model Aviation.

Other offsite work includes charity flight demonstrations and Delta Dart contests at the Palm Springs Air Museum and both flight demonstrations and public presence at the Jacqueline Cochran Regional Air Show at Jacqueline Cochran Regional Airport in nearby Thermal.

Club members and guests who operate model aircraft at the club's field are required to hold current AMA membership in addition to club membership. No AMA membership is required to participate in "buddy box" activities with an experienced instructor.
