= 2000 United States presidential election in California =

- November 7, 2000
- Turnout: 70.94% (of registered voters) ▲5.41 pp 51.92% (of eligible voters) ▼0.64 pp

Nominee	Al Gore	George W. Bush
Party	Democratic	Republican
Home state	Tennessee	Texas
Running mate	Joe Lieberman	Dick Cheney
Electoral vote	54	0
Popular vote	5,861,203	4,567,429
Percentage	53.45%	41.65%
Gore
40–50%
50–60%
60–70%
70–80%
Bush
40–50%
50–60%
60–70%
70–80%
President before election
Bill Clinton
Democratic
Elected President
George W. Bush
Republican

The 2000 United States presidential election in California took place on November 7, 2000, as part of the wider 2000 United States presidential election. Voters chose 54 representatives, or electors, to the Electoral College, who voted for president and vice president.

California was won by the Democratic ticket of Vice President Al Gore of Tennessee and Senator Joe Lieberman of Connecticut by 11.8% points over the Republican ticket of Texas Governor George W. Bush and former U.S. secretary of defense Dick Cheney of Wyoming.

The state hosted the 2000 Democratic National Convention in Los Angeles and was slightly contested by both candidates due to a large Hispanic population and a large independent and moderate base surrounding San Diego and Sacramento's suburbs. This was the first time since 1880 in which a winning Republican presidential candidate lost California, and the first time ever that a losing Democrat won a majority of the vote in the state. As of the 2024 presidential election, Bush is the last Republican candidate to carry Alpine and Mono counties in a presidential election. This was also the first time since 1976 that California did not back the candidate who won the overall presidential election as well.

Bush became the first ever Republican to win the White House without carrying Imperial County, as well as the first to do so without carrying Santa Barbara County since Abraham Lincoln in 1860, the first to do so without carrying Monterey County since William McKinley in 1896, the first to do so without carrying San Benito County since William McKinley in 1900, and the first to do so without carrying Napa or Sacramento counties since Richard Nixon in 1968. He also became the first nominee of either party to win the White House without receiving at least a million votes from Los Angeles County since this county first gave any nominee a million votes, in 1952. This feat would be reprised by Donald Trump in 2016.

California was one of ten states that backed George H. W. Bush in his successful bid in 1988 that did not back George W. Bush in either 2000 or 2004.

== General election ==
=== Polling ===
Poll source	Date(s)	Sample size	Margin of error	George W. Bush (R)	Al Gore (D)	Ralph Nader (G)	Other / undecided (Note: Calculated by taking the difference of 100% and all other listed candidates combined. For polls that do not report a figure for Nader, this includes his support.)
Zogby Analytics	November 5, 2000	596	—	45%	45%	8%	2%
Field Research Corp. (Field Poll)	November 3, 2000	924	—	41%	46%	4%	9%
Harris Insights & Analytics	November 3, 2000	25,017	—	43%	49%	6%	2%
Zogby Analytics	November 2, 2000	600	—	40%	48%	5%	7%
SurveyUSA	November 1, 2000	530	—	43%	49%	7%	1%
Research 2000	October 31, 2000	820	—	40%	47%	5%	8%
Field Research Corp. (Field Poll)	October 29, 2000	990	—	40%	47%	4%	9%
Rasmussen Reports	October 29, 2000	1,536	—	41%	44%	—	15%
SurveyUSA	October 25, 2000	530	—	43%	47%	7%	3%
Research 2000	October 24, 2000	822	—	39%	49%	5%	7%
Los Angeles Times	October 21, 2000	852	—	41%	48%	5%	6%

=== Results ===
2000 United States presidential election in California
Party	Candidate	Votes	Percentage	Electoral votes
Democratic	Albert A. Gore Jr. and Joseph Lieberman	5,861,203	53.45%	54
Republican	George W. Bush and Richard B. Cheney	4,567,429	41.65%	0
Green	Ralph Nader and Winona LaDuke	418,707	3.82%	0
Libertarian	Harry Browne	45,520	0.42%	0
Reform	Pat Buchanan	44,987	0.41%	0
American Independent	Howard Phillips	17,042	0.16%	0
Natural Law	John Hagelin	10,934	0.10%	0
write-in	David McReynolds	28	0.00%	0
	Other write-in	6	0.00%	0
Invalid or blank votes		177,010	1.59%	—
Totals		10,965,856	100.00%	54
Voter turnout		70.94%		—

==== By county ====
County	Al Gore Democratic		George W. Bush Republican		Ralph Nader Green		Various candidates Other parties		Margin		Total votes cast
County	#	%	#	%	#	%	#	%	#	%	Total votes cast
Alameda	342,889	69.36%	119,279	24.13%	27,499	5.56%	4,669	0.95%	223,610	45.23%	494,336
Alpine	265	45.22%	281	47.95%	25	4.27%	15	2.56%	-16	-2.73%	586
Amador	5,906	38.19%	8,766	56.69%	584	3.78%	208	1.34%	-2,860	-18.50%	15,464
Butte	31,338	37.43%	45,584	54.45%	5,727	6.84%	1,072	1.28%	-14,246	-17.02%	83,721
Calaveras	7,093	37.58%	10,599	56.15%	863	4.57%	321	1.69%	-3,506	-18.57%	18,876
Colusa	1,745	31.22%	3,629	64.92%	151	2.70%	65	1.16%	-1,884	-33.70%	5,590
Contra Costa	224,338	58.81%	141,373	37.06%	13,067	3.43%	2,700	0.71%	82,965	21.75%	381,478
Del Norte	3,117	37.58%	4,526	54.57%	485	5.85%	166	2.00%	-1,409	-16.99%	8,294
El Dorado	26,220	36.35%	42,045	58.29%	3,013	4.18%	858	1.19%	-15,825	-21.94%	72,136
Fresno	95,059	43.05%	117,342	53.14%	6,541	2.96%	1,893	0.86%	-22,283	-10.09%	220,835
Glenn	2,498	28.68%	5,795	66.53%	268	3.08%	150	1.72%	-3,297	-37.85%	8,711
Humboldt	24,851	44.40%	23,219	41.48%	7,100	12.68%	802	1.44%	1,632	2.92%	55,972
Imperial	15,489	53.53%	12,524	43.28%	608	2.10%	316	1.09%	2,965	10.25%	28,937
Inyo	2,652	33.93%	4,713	60.31%	344	4.40%	106	1.35%	-2,061	-26.38%	7,815
Kern	66,003	36.20%	110,663	60.70%	3,474	1.91%	2,168	1.18%	-44,660	-24.50%	182,308
Kings	11,041	38.97%	16,377	57.80%	567	2.00%	350	1.24%	-5,336	-18.83%	28,335
Lake	10,717	51.23%	8,699	41.58%	1,265	6.05%	238	1.14%	2,018	9.65%	20,919
Lassen	2,982	28.17%	7,080	66.88%	339	3.20%	185	1.75%	-4,098	-38.71%	10,586
Los Angeles	1,710,505	63.47%	871,930	32.35%	83,731	3.11%	28,988	1.08%	838,575	31.12%	2,695,154
Madera	11,650	34.89%	20,283	60.74%	1,080	3.23%	382	1.14%	-8,633	-25.85%	33,395
Marin	79,135	64.26%	34,872	28.32%	8,289	6.73%	859	0.70%	44,263	35.94%	123,155
Mariposa	2,816	34.88%	4,727	58.55%	379	4.69%	152	1.88%	-1,911	-23.67%	8,074
Mendocino	16,634	48.34%	12,272	35.66%	5,051	14.68%	453	1.32%	4,362	12.68%	34,410
Merced	22,726	45.08%	26,102	51.77%	1,166	2.31%	424	0.84%	-3,376	-6.69%	50,418
Modoc	945	23.07%	2,969	72.47%	122	2.98%	61	1.49%	-2,024	-49.28%	4,107
Mono	1,788	40.91%	2,296	52.53%	230	5.26%	57	1.30%	-508	-11.62%	4,371
Monterey	67,618	57.53%	43,761	37.23%	5,059	4.30%	1,096	0.93%	23,857	20.30%	117,534
Napa	28,097	54.32%	20,633	39.89%	2,471	4.78%	523	1.01%	7,464	14.43%	51,724
Nevada	17,670	37.22%	25,998	54.76%	3,287	6.92%	524	1.10%	-8,328	-17.54%	47,479
Orange	391,819	40.36%	541,299	55.75%	26,833	2.76%	10,954	1.13%	-149,480	-15.39%	970,905
Placer	42,449	36.04%	69,835	59.28%	4,449	3.78%	1,061	0.90%	-27,386	-23.24%	117,799
Plumas	3,458	33.25%	6,343	60.98%	456	4.38%	144	1.38%	-2,885	-27.73%	10,401
Riverside	202,576	44.90%	231,955	51.42%	11,678	2.59%	4,918	1.09%	-29,379	-6.52%	451,127
Sacramento	212,792	49.31%	195,619	45.33%	17,659	4.09%	5,480	1.27%	17,173	3.98%	431,550
San Benito	9,131	54.25%	7,015	41.68%	535	3.18%	150	0.89%	2,116	12.57%	16,831
San Bernardino	214,749	47.21%	221,757	48.75%	11,775	2.59%	6,612	1.45%	-7,008	-1.54%	454,893
San Diego	437,666	45.66%	475,736	49.63%	33,979	3.54%	11,253	1.17%	-38,070	-3.97%	958,634
San Francisco	241,578	75.54%	51,496	16.10%	24,828	7.76%	1,884	0.59%	190,082	59.44%	319,786
San Joaquin	79,776	47.70%	81,773	48.90%	4,195	2.51%	1,485	0.89%	-1,997	-1.20%	167,239
San Luis Obispo	44,526	40.89%	56,859	52.22%	6,523	5.99%	978	0.90%	-12,333	-11.33%	108,886
San Mateo	166,757	64.29%	80,296	30.95%	10,433	4.02%	1,913	0.73%	86,461	33.34%	259,399
Santa Barbara	73,411	47.37%	71,493	46.13%	8,664	5.59%	1,406	0.91%	1,918	1.24%	154,974
Santa Clara	332,490	60.66%	188,750	34.44%	19,072	3.48%	7,817	1.43%	143,740	26.22%	548,129
Santa Cruz	66,618	61.48%	29,627	27.34%	10,844	10.01%	1,261	1.16%	36,991	34.14%	108,350
Shasta	20,127	30.25%	43,278	65.04%	2,131	3.20%	1,008	1.51%	-23,151	-34.79%	66,544
Sierra	540	29.24%	1,172	63.45%	86	4.66%	49	2.65%	-632	-34.21%	1,847
Siskiyou	6,323	31.90%	12,198	61.55%	872	4.40%	426	2.15%	-5,875	-29.65%	19,819
Solano	75,116	57.02%	51,604	39.17%	3,869	2.94%	1,146	0.87%	23,512	17.85%	131,735
Sonoma	117,295	59.54%	63,529	32.25%	14,324	7.27%	1,858	0.94%	53,766	27.29%	197,006
Stanislaus	56,448	44.01%	67,188	52.38%	3,398	2.65%	1,233	0.96%	-10,740	-8.37%	128,267
Sutter	8,416	31.68%	17,350	65.31%	594	2.24%	204	0.77%	-8,934	-33.63%	26,564
Tehama	6,507	31.20%	13,270	63.63%	697	3.34%	380	1.82%	-6,763	-32.43%	20,854
Trinity	1,932	33.33%	3,340	57.62%	396	6.83%	129	2.23%	-1,408	-24.29%	5,797
Tulare	33,006	36.75%	54,070	60.20%	1,834	2.04%	908	1.01%	-21,064	-23.45%	89,818
Tuolumne	9,359	39.44%	13,172	55.51%	949	4.00%	247	1.04%	-3,813	-16.07%	23,727
Ventura	133,258	47.14%	136,173	48.17%	10,235	3.62%	3,026	1.07%	-2,915	-1.03%	282,692
Yolo	33,747	54.93%	23,057	37.53%	4,107	6.69%	525	0.85%	10,690	17.40%	61,436
Yuba	5,546	34.39%	9,838	61.00%	507	3.14%	236	1.46%	-4,292	-26.61%	16,127
Total	5,861,203	53.45%	4,567,429	41.65%	418,707	3.82%	118,517	1.09%	1,293,774	11.80%	10,965,856

===== Counties that flipped from Democratic to Republican =====
- Merced (largest city: Merced)
- San Bernardino (largest city: San Bernardino)
- San Joaquin (largest city: Stockton)
- Stanislaus (largest city: Modesto)
- Ventura (largest city: Ventura)

==== By congressional district ====
Gore won 33 of 52 congressional districts, including three that elected Republicans, with the remaining 19 going to Bush, including two that elected Democrats.

District	Gore	Bush	Representative
1st	50%	41%	Mike Thompson
2nd	34%	59%	Wally Herger
3rd	44%	51%	Doug Ose
4th	37%	58%	John Doolittle
5th	57%	37%	Bob Matsui
6th	62%	30%	Lynn Woolsey
7th	69%	27%	George Miller
8th	77%	15%	Nancy Pelosi
9th	79%	12%	Barbara Lee
10th	51%	45%	Ellen Tauscher
11th	47%	50%	Richard Pombo
12th	67%	27%	Tom Lantos
13th	66%	30%	Pete Stark
14th	62%	32%	Anna Eshoo
15th	57%	38%	Tom Campbell
15th	57%	38%	Mike Honda
16th	64%	32%	Zoe Lofgren
17th	60%	33%	Sam Farr
18th	44%	53%	Gary Condit
19th	38%	58%	George Radanovich
20th	50%	48%	Cal Dooley
21st	33%	64%	Bill Thomas
22nd	45%	49%	Lois Capps
23rd	48%	47%	Elton Gallegly
24th	58%	38%	Brad Sherman
25th	45%	51%	Buck McKeon
26th	70%	25%	Howard Berman
27th	53%	41%	Jim Rogan
27th	53%	41%	Adam Schiff
28th	49%	47%	David Dreier
29th	72%	22%	Henry Waxman
30th	75%	19%	Xavier Becerra
31st	69%	27%	Matthew G. Martínez
31st	69%	27%	Hilda Solis
32nd	83%	13%	Diane Watson
33rd	83%	15%	Lucille Roybal-Allard
34th	67%	30%	Grace Napolitano
35th	86%	12%	Maxine Waters
36th	51%	44%	Steven T. Kuykendall
36th	51%	44%	Jane Harman
37th	83%	15%	Juanita Millender-McDonald
38th	58%	37%	Steve Horn
39th	43%	53%	Ed Royce
40th	39%	56%	Jerry Lewis
41st	47%	50%	Gary Miller
42nd	57%	39%	Joe Baca
43rd	44%	52%	Ken Calvert
44th	47%	49%	Mary Bono
45th	40%	56%	Dana Rohrabacher
46th	54%	42%	Loretta Sánchez
47th	39%	57%	Christopher Cox
48th	36%	60%	Ron Packard
48th	36%	60%	Darrell Issa
49th	53%	41%	Brian Bilbray
49th	53%	41%	Susan Davis
50th	59%	37%	Bob Filner
51st	41%	55%	Duke Cunningham
52nd	41%	54%	Duncan Hunter

==== By city ====
Official outcome by city and unincorporated areas of counties, of which Gore won 277 & Bush won 252.
City	County	Al Gore Democratic		George W. Bush Republican		Ralph Nader Green		Various candidates Other parties		Margin		Total Votes	1996 to 2000 Swing%
City	County	#	%	#	%	#	%	#	%	#	%	Total Votes	1996 to 2000 Swing%
Alameda	Alameda	19,517	67.41%	7,531	26.01%	1,656	5.72%	250	0.86%	11,986	41.40%	28,954	7.11%
Albany	Alameda	5,892	77.68%	936	12.34%	686	9.04%	71	0.94%	4,956	65.34%	7,585	7.26%
Berkeley	Alameda	42,167	78.14%	4,177	7.74%	7,100	13.16%	518	0.96%	37,990	70.40%	53,962	5.18%
Dublin	Alameda	5,282	52.74%	4,356	43.49%	293	2.93%	85	0.85%	926	9.25%	10,016	-3.83%
Emeryville	Alameda	2,132	77.16%	352	12.74%	249	9.01%	30	1.09%	1,780	64.42%	2,763	7.32%
Fremont	Alameda	37,069	61.01%	21,123	34.77%	1,899	3.13%	664	1.09%	15,946	26.25%	60,755	1.23%
Hayward	Alameda	23,562	71.30%	8,121	24.57%	1,026	3.10%	338	1.02%	15,441	46.72%	33,047	1.36%
Livermore	Alameda	14,066	47.91%	14,110	48.06%	912	3.11%	272	0.93%	-44	-0.15%	29,360	-1.91%
Newark	Alameda	7,901	65.01%	3,737	30.75%	378	3.11%	137	1.13%	4,164	34.26%	12,153	3.34%
Oakland	Alameda	107,482	82.52%	12,350	9.48%	9,331	7.16%	1,092	0.84%	95,132	73.04%	130,255	2.37%
Piedmont	Alameda	3,923	61.88%	2,110	33.28%	274	4.32%	33	0.52%	1,813	28.60%	6,340	10.25%
Pleasanton	Alameda	13,506	47.96%	13,633	48.41%	786	2.79%	238	0.85%	-127	-0.45%	28,163	-1.21%
San Leandro	Alameda	18,671	69.46%	7,073	26.31%	906	3.37%	231	0.86%	11,598	43.15%	26,881	2.87%
Union City	Alameda	12,075	71.79%	4,226	25.13%	354	2.10%	164	0.98%	7,849	46.67%	16,819	1.54%
Unincorporated area	Alameda	29,469	62.62%	15,420	32.77%	1,641	3.49%	531	1.13%	14,049	29.85%	47,061	2.40%
Unapportioned absentees	Alameda	175	80.28%	24	11.01%	8	3.67%	11	5.05%	151	69.27%	218	37.16%
Unincorporated area	Alpine	265	45.22%	281	47.95%	25	4.27%	15	2.56%	-16	-2.73%	586	-1.75%
Amador City	Amador	45	43.27%	47	45.19%	10	9.62%	2	1.92%	-2	-1.92%	104	5.05%
Ione	Amador	411	33.09%	788	63.45%	31	2.50%	12	0.97%	-377	-30.35%	1,242	-19.16%
Jackson	Amador	746	42.05%	925	52.14%	75	4.23%	28	1.58%	-179	-10.09%	1,774	-14.84%
Plymouth	Amador	149	37.53%	231	58.19%	10	2.52%	7	1.76%	-82	-20.65%	397	-17.45%
Sutter Creek	Amador	498	40.95%	648	53.29%	60	4.93%	10	0.82%	-150	-12.34%	1,216	-15.23%
Unincorporated area	Amador	4,057	37.81%	6,127	57.10%	398	3.71%	149	1.39%	-2,070	-19.29%	10,731	-9.39%
Biggs	Butte	165	32.23%	328	64.06%	14	2.73%	5	0.98%	-163	-31.84%	512	-12.87%
Chico	Butte	10,216	43.23%	10,729	45.40%	2,458	10.40%	230	0.97%	-513	-2.17%	23,633	-6.91%
Gridley	Butte	583	42.00%	753	54.25%	31	2.23%	21	1.51%	-170	-12.25%	1,388	-5.88%
Oroville	Butte	1,345	39.97%	1,840	54.68%	126	3.74%	54	1.60%	-495	-14.71%	3,365	-9.13%
Paradise	Butte	4,639	35.96%	7,369	57.12%	710	5.50%	184	1.43%	-2,730	-21.16%	12,902	-5.19%
Unincorporated area	Butte	14,390	34.33%	24,565	58.60%	2,388	5.70%	578	1.38%	-10,175	-24.27%	41,921	-7.78%
Angels	Calaveras	289	34.86%	483	58.26%	37	4.46%	20	2.41%	-194	-23.40%	829	-20.00%
Unincorporated area	Calaveras	4,214	38.23%	6,084	55.20%	548	4.97%	176	1.60%	-1,870	-16.97%	11,022	-7.35%
Unapportioned absentees	Calaveras	2,590	36.87%	4,032	57.40%	278	3.96%	125	1.78%	-1,442	-20.53%	7,025	-10.41%
Colusa	Colusa	610	33.85%	1,114	61.82%	58	3.22%	20	1.11%	-504	-27.97%	1,802	-18.03%
Williams	Colusa	264	44.67%	309	52.28%	13	2.20%	5	0.85%	-45	-7.61%	591	-9.95%
Unincorporated area	Colusa	871	27.24%	2,206	69.00%	80	2.50%	40	1.25%	-1,335	-41.76%	3,197	-18.86%
Antioch	Contra Costa	18,753	60.04%	11,449	36.65%	787	2.52%	246	0.79%	7,304	23.38%	31,235	0.64%
Brentwood	Contra Costa	4,226	48.69%	4,221	48.63%	179	2.06%	54	0.62%	5	0.06%	8,680	-7.98%
Clayton	Contra Costa	2,653	44.12%	3,161	52.57%	174	2.89%	25	0.42%	-508	-8.45%	6,013	-4.52%
Concord	Contra Costa	25,640	57.83%	16,618	37.48%	1,693	3.82%	388	0.88%	9,022	20.35%	44,339	-0.77%
Danville	Contra Costa	9,543	43.55%	11,734	53.55%	525	2.40%	110	0.50%	-2,191	-10.00%	21,912	1.56%
El Cerrito	Contra Costa	8,772	74.12%	2,088	17.64%	885	7.48%	90	0.76%	6,684	56.48%	11,835	5.45%
Hercules	Contra Costa	5,240	73.17%	1,718	23.99%	168	2.35%	35	0.49%	3,522	49.18%	7,161	3.78%
Lafayette	Contra Costa	7,110	52.15%	5,840	42.84%	595	4.36%	88	0.65%	1,270	9.32%	13,633	3.40%
Martinez	Contra Costa	10,001	59.65%	5,958	35.53%	666	3.97%	142	0.85%	4,043	24.11%	16,767	27.56%
Moraga	Contra Costa	4,129	47.51%	4,184	48.14%	327	3.76%	51	0.59%	-55	-0.63%	8,691	-25.08%
Oakley	Contra Costa	4,726	55.10%	3,577	41.70%	194	2.26%	80	0.93%	1,149	13.40%	8,577	N/A
Orinda	Contra Costa	5,515	51.45%	4,746	44.28%	382	3.56%	76	0.71%	769	7.17%	10,719	5.85%
Pinole	Contra Costa	4,892	65.66%	2,239	30.05%	262	3.52%	57	0.77%	2,653	35.61%	7,450	-10.10%
Pittsburg	Contra Costa	11,864	71.83%	4,168	25.23%	343	2.08%	142	0.86%	7,696	46.59%	16,517	25.11%
Pleasant Hill	Contra Costa	8,842	57.87%	5,592	36.60%	718	4.70%	128	0.84%	3,250	21.27%	15,280	-11.36%
Richmond	Contra Costa	24,292	83.34%	3,657	12.55%	1,045	3.59%	153	0.52%	20,635	70.80%	29,147	1.82%
San Pablo	Contra Costa	4,126	82.26%	739	14.73%	123	2.45%	28	0.56%	3,387	67.52%	5,016	3.96%
San Ramon	Contra Costa	9,384	48.16%	9,525	48.89%	446	2.29%	129	0.66%	-141	-0.72%	19,484	0.43%
Walnut Creek	Contra Costa	19,210	54.07%	14,901	41.95%	1,205	3.39%	209	0.59%	4,309	12.13%	35,525	3.64%
Unincorporated area	Contra Costa	35,420	55.78%	25,258	39.78%	2,350	3.70%	469	0.74%	10,162	16.00%	63,497	1.78%
Crescent City	Del Norte	429	42.27%	496	48.87%	69	6.80%	21	2.07%	-67	-6.60%	1,015	-18.81%
Unincorporated area	Del Norte	2,688	36.93%	4,030	55.36%	416	5.72%	145	1.99%	-1,342	-18.44%	7,279	-17.06%
Placerville	El Dorado	1,576	41.15%	2,007	52.40%	198	5.17%	49	1.28%	-431	-11.25%	3,830	-9.25%
South Lake Tahoe	El Dorado	3,200	54.14%	2,262	38.27%	353	5.97%	96	1.62%	938	15.87%	5,911	2.66%
Unincorporated area	El Dorado	21,444	34.37%	37,776	60.54%	2,462	3.95%	713	1.14%	-16,332	-26.18%	62,395	-6.78%
Clovis	Fresno	8,470	33.04%	16,270	63.46%	724	2.82%	175	0.68%	-7,800	-30.42%	25,639	-11.01%
Coalinga	Fresno	996	37.66%	1,542	58.30%	69	2.61%	38	1.44%	-546	-20.64%	2,645	-11.59%
Firebaugh	Fresno	500	58.96%	332	39.15%	12	1.42%	4	0.47%	168	19.81%	848	-16.17%
Fowler	Fresno	575	53.89%	466	43.67%	19	1.78%	7	0.66%	109	10.22%	1,067	-2.82%
Fresno	Fresno	52,811	47.50%	53,818	48.41%	3,628	3.26%	921	0.83%	-1,007	-0.91%	111,178	-6.85%
Huron	Fresno	479	86.00%	74	13.29%	1	0.18%	3	0.54%	405	72.71%	557	-4.03%
Kerman	Fresno	835	50.76%	764	46.44%	31	1.88%	15	0.91%	71	4.32%	1,645	-3.75%
Kingsburg	Fresno	1,014	28.82%	2,368	67.29%	90	2.56%	47	1.34%	-1,354	-38.48%	3,519	-10.84%
Mendota	Fresno	827	80.21%	193	18.72%	4	0.39%	7	0.68%	634	61.49%	1,031	-10.36%
Orange Cove	Fresno	612	72.26%	228	26.92%	1	0.12%	6	0.71%	384	45.34%	847	-16.85%
Parlier	Fresno	1,282	82.39%	253	16.26%	15	0.96%	6	0.39%	1,029	66.13%	1,556	-16.46%
Reedley	Fresno	2,001	39.87%	2,857	56.92%	111	2.21%	50	1.00%	-856	-17.06%	5,019	-4.26%
San Joaquin	Fresno	219	78.78%	55	19.78%	4	1.44%	0	0.00%	164	58.99%	278	1.35%
Sanger	Fresno	2,684	62.51%	1,498	34.89%	77	1.79%	35	0.82%	1,186	27.62%	4,294	-11.12%
Selma	Fresno	2,382	53.02%	2,005	44.62%	69	1.54%	37	0.82%	377	8.39%	4,493	-10.66%
Unincorporated area	Fresno	19,372	34.46%	34,619	61.58%	1,686	3.00%	542	0.96%	-15,247	-27.12%	56,219	-8.59%
Orland	Glenn	491	31.90%	968	62.90%	45	2.92%	35	2.27%	-477	-30.99%	1,539	-10.91%
Willows	Glenn	618	31.61%	1,246	63.73%	52	2.66%	39	1.99%	-628	-32.12%	1,955	-16.91%
Unincorporated area	Glenn	1,389	26.62%	3,581	68.64%	171	3.28%	76	1.46%	-2,192	-42.02%	5,217	-11.03%
Arcata	Humboldt	4,612	54.86%	1,580	18.79%	2,121	25.23%	94	1.12%	3,032	36.07%	8,407	-4.41%
Blue Lake	Humboldt	275	45.91%	216	36.06%	104	17.36%	4	0.67%	59	9.85%	599	-13.24%
Eureka	Humboldt	4,913	47.68%	4,292	41.65%	926	8.99%	174	1.69%	621	6.03%	10,305	-5.50%
Ferndale	Humboldt	299	37.90%	437	55.39%	43	5.45%	10	1.27%	-138	-17.49%	789	-4.54%
Fortuna	Humboldt	1,426	34.51%	2,428	58.76%	214	5.18%	64	1.55%	-1,002	-24.25%	4,132	-15.80%
Rio Dell	Humboldt	275	28.26%	631	64.85%	42	4.32%	25	2.57%	-356	-36.59%	973	-27.30%
Trinidad	Humboldt	124	54.39%	78	34.21%	25	10.96%	1	0.44%	46	20.18%	228	6.09%
Unincorporated area	Humboldt	12,927	42.33%	13,557	44.39%	3,625	11.87%	430	1.41%	-630	-2.06%	30,539	-10.15%
Brawley	Imperial	2,729	52.82%	2,298	44.47%	91	1.76%	49	0.95%	431	8.34%	5,167	-12.43%
Calexico	Imperial	3,557	75.25%	1,037	21.94%	81	1.71%	52	1.10%	2,520	53.31%	4,727	-20.11%
Calipatria	Imperial	347	59.72%	221	38.04%	7	1.20%	6	1.03%	126	21.69%	581	-11.16%
El Centro	Imperial	4,566	51.73%	3,966	44.94%	211	2.39%	83	0.94%	600	6.80%	8,826	-12.72%
Holtville	Imperial	829	39.87%	1,196	57.53%	36	1.73%	18	0.87%	-367	-17.65%	2,079	-23.13%
Imperial	Imperial	875	41.47%	1,168	55.36%	45	2.13%	22	1.04%	-293	-13.89%	2,110	-16.84%
Westmorland	Imperial	235	57.74%	159	39.07%	10	2.46%	3	0.74%	76	18.67%	407	-12.96%
Unincorporated area	Imperial	2,351	46.65%	2,479	49.19%	127	2.52%	83	1.65%	-128	-2.54%	5,040	-2.01%
Bishop	Inyo	459	35.15%	766	58.65%	63	4.82%	18	1.38%	-307	-23.51%	1,306	50.91%
Unincorporated area	Inyo	2,193	33.69%	3,947	60.64%	281	4.32%	88	1.35%	-1,754	-26.95%	6,509	-68.66%
Arvin	Kern	1,093	69.05%	474	29.94%	6	0.38%	10	0.63%	619	39.10%	1,583	-5.27%
Bakersfield	Kern	27,244	36.61%	45,134	60.66%	1,331	1.79%	698	0.94%	-17,890	-24.04%	74,407	-4.74%
California City	Kern	988	34.52%	1,763	61.60%	62	2.17%	49	1.71%	-775	-27.08%	2,862	-10.19%
Delano	Kern	3,698	68.72%	1,598	29.70%	39	0.72%	46	0.85%	2,100	39.03%	5,381	-1.20%
Maricopa	Kern	98	26.85%	256	70.14%	3	0.82%	8	2.19%	-158	-43.29%	365	-27.67%
McFarland	Kern	918	73.44%	312	24.96%	9	0.72%	11	0.88%	606	48.48%	1,250	3.75%
Ridgecrest	Kern	2,471	25.42%	6,863	70.60%	250	2.57%	137	1.41%	-4,392	-45.18%	9,721	-13.42%
Shafter	Kern	1,090	42.63%	1,415	55.34%	27	1.06%	25	0.98%	-325	-12.71%	2,557	-0.43%
Taft	Kern	514	23.21%	1,625	73.36%	34	1.53%	42	1.90%	-1,111	-50.16%	2,215	-18.73%
Tehachapi	Kern	782	34.22%	1,386	60.66%	76	3.33%	41	1.79%	-604	-26.43%	2,285	-15.37%
Wasco	Kern	1,516	53.68%	1,262	44.69%	23	0.81%	23	0.81%	254	8.99%	2,824	-4.27%
Unincorporated area	Kern	25,591	33.30%	48,575	63.20%	1,614	2.10%	1,078	1.40%	-22,984	-29.90%	76,858	-10.08%
Avenal	Kings	482	59.14%	315	38.65%	9	1.10%	9	1.10%	167	20.49%	815	-9.16%
Corcoran	Kings	1,356	56.93%	952	39.97%	50	2.10%	24	1.01%	404	16.96%	2,382	-4.17%
Hanford	Kings	4,638	37.86%	7,196	58.74%	265	2.16%	152	1.24%	-2,558	-20.88%	12,251	-16.84%
Lemoore	Kings	1,701	34.07%	3,119	62.48%	110	2.20%	62	1.24%	-1,418	-28.41%	4,992	-14.31%
Unincorporated area	Kings	2,864	36.28%	4,795	60.73%	133	1.68%	103	1.30%	-1,931	-24.46%	7,895	-14.18%
Clearlake	Lake	2,188	63.27%	1,072	31.00%	160	4.63%	38	1.10%	1,116	32.27%	3,458	-12.81%
Lakeport	Lake	856	44.35%	912	47.25%	147	7.62%	15	0.78%	-56	-2.90%	1,930	2.79%
Unincorporated area	Lake	7,673	49.40%	6,715	43.24%	958	6.17%	185	1.19%	958	6.17%	15,531	-3.04%
Susanville	Lassen	1,029	31.21%	2,106	63.88%	111	3.37%	51	1.55%	-1,077	-32.67%	3,297	-20.80%
Unincorporated area	Lassen	1,953	26.99%	4,974	68.75%	228	3.15%	80	1.11%	-3,021	-41.76%	7,235	-18.68%
Agoura Hills	Los Angeles	4,208	56.07%	3,000	39.97%	235	3.13%	62	0.83%	1,208	16.10%	7,505	9.22%
Alhambra	Los Angeles	11,437	66.51%	5,082	29.55%	513	2.98%	165	0.96%	6,355	36.95%	17,197	6.52%
Arcadia	Los Angeles	5,740	40.80%	7,833	55.67%	365	2.59%	132	0.94%	-2,093	-14.88%	14,070	4.87%
Artesia	Los Angeles	1,932	60.72%	1,132	35.58%	73	2.29%	45	1.41%	800	25.14%	3,182	-0.44%
Avalon	Los Angeles	405	43.74%	422	45.57%	87	9.40%	12	1.30%	-17	-1.84%	926	5.53%
Azusa	Los Angeles	4,756	57.47%	3,207	38.75%	221	2.67%	92	1.11%	1,549	18.72%	8,276	0.24%
Baldwin Park	Los Angeles	9,055	77.41%	2,358	20.16%	182	1.56%	103	0.88%	6,697	57.25%	11,698	3.17%
Bell	Los Angeles	3,352	80.04%	748	17.86%	59	1.41%	29	0.69%	2,604	62.18%	4,188	3.04%
Bell Gardens	Los Angeles	3,549	84.97%	561	13.43%	46	1.10%	21	0.50%	2,988	71.53%	4,177	1.40%
Bellflower	Los Angeles	8,776	60.27%	5,275	36.22%	322	2.21%	189	1.30%	3,501	24.04%	14,562	13.60%
Beverly Hills	Los Angeles	8,399	76.51%	2,247	20.47%	251	2.29%	80	0.73%	6,152	56.04%	10,977	12.48%
Burbank	Los Angeles	17,383	56.77%	11,559	37.75%	1,300	4.25%	376	1.23%	5,824	19.02%	30,618	6.20%
Calabasas	Los Angeles	4,618	62.96%	2,477	33.77%	190	2.59%	50	0.68%	2,141	29.19%	7,335	7.74%
Carson	Los Angeles	18,081	76.95%	4,857	20.67%	364	1.55%	196	0.83%	13,224	56.28%	23,498	-0.31%
Cerritos	Los Angeles	8,260	54.97%	6,313	42.01%	336	2.24%	118	0.79%	1,947	12.96%	15,027	-0.04%
Claremont	Los Angeles	7,038	54.99%	4,864	38.01%	767	5.99%	129	1.01%	2,174	16.99%	12,798	3.12%
Commerce	Los Angeles	2,456	85.34%	357	12.40%	52	1.81%	13	0.45%	2,099	72.93%	2,878	2.05%
Compton	Los Angeles	15,265	94.85%	590	3.67%	98	0.61%	140	0.87%	14,675	91.19%	16,093	-0.68%
Covina	Los Angeles	6,903	50.56%	6,214	45.52%	371	2.72%	164	1.20%	689	5.05%	13,652	4.66%
Cudahy	Los Angeles	1,951	84.42%	331	14.32%	22	0.95%	7	0.30%	1,620	70.10%	2,311	4.63%
Culver City	Los Angeles	9,966	71.15%	3,322	23.72%	592	4.23%	127	0.91%	6,644	47.43%	14,007	4.03%
Diamond Bar	Los Angeles	7,408	49.83%	6,988	47.00%	344	2.31%	127	0.85%	420	2.83%	14,867	1.80%
Downey	Los Angeles	14,355	57.22%	9,861	39.31%	580	2.31%	292	1.16%	4,494	17.91%	25,088	9.57%
Duarte	Los Angeles	3,435	60.08%	2,046	35.79%	168	2.94%	68	1.19%	1,389	24.30%	5,717	5.74%
El Monte	Los Angeles	10,140	73.75%	3,213	23.37%	288	2.09%	109	0.79%	6,927	50.38%	13,750	4.51%
El Segundo	Los Angeles	2,745	44.64%	3,074	49.99%	231	3.76%	99	1.61%	-329	-5.35%	6,149	1.52%
Gardena	Los Angeles	9,492	74.02%	2,951	23.01%	279	2.18%	102	0.80%	6,541	51.01%	12,824	4.88%
Glendale	Los Angeles	21,846	51.35%	18,459	43.39%	1,816	4.27%	420	0.99%	3,387	7.96%	42,541	7.59%
Glendora	Los Angeles	6,286	36.92%	10,086	59.24%	472	2.77%	183	1.07%	-3,800	-22.32%	17,027	-3.91%
Hawaiian Gardens	Los Angeles	1,215	70.52%	446	25.89%	36	2.09%	26	1.51%	769	44.63%	1,723	-9.86%
Hawthorne	Los Angeles	11,127	75.21%	3,295	22.27%	269	1.82%	103	0.70%	7,832	52.94%	14,794	7.30%
Hermosa Beach	Los Angeles	4,289	52.83%	3,323	40.93%	409	5.04%	98	1.21%	966	11.90%	8,119	1.42%
Hidden Hills	Los Angeles	412	53.16%	339	43.74%	22	2.84%	2	0.26%	73	9.42%	775	6.42%
Huntington Park	Los Angeles	5,641	83.45%	981	14.51%	91	1.35%	47	0.70%	4,660	68.93%	6,760	1.90%
Inglewood	Los Angeles	22,076	90.94%	1,698	6.99%	336	1.38%	166	0.68%	20,378	83.94%	24,276	2.88%
Irwindale	Los Angeles	308	77.00%	87	21.75%	3	0.75%	2	0.50%	221	55.25%	400	1.61%
La Cañada Flintridge	Los Angeles	2,698	38.11%	4,087	57.73%	225	3.18%	69	0.97%	-1,389	-19.62%	7,079	6.53%
La Habra Heights	Los Angeles	524	28.34%	1,246	67.39%	55	2.97%	24	1.30%	-722	-39.05%	1,849	2.91%
La Mirada	Los Angeles	6,620	44.82%	7,681	52.00%	311	2.11%	158	1.07%	-1,061	-7.18%	14,770	-0.95%
La Puente	Los Angeles	5,426	76.81%	1,465	20.74%	118	1.67%	55	0.78%	3,961	56.07%	7,064	0.42%
La Verne	Los Angeles	4,811	42.44%	6,084	53.66%	333	2.94%	109	0.96%	-1,273	-11.23%	11,337	-5.56%
Lakewood	Los Angeles	13,048	52.11%	10,884	43.47%	784	3.13%	321	1.28%	2,164	8.64%	25,037	1.49%
Lancaster	Los Angeles	10,424	39.91%	14,794	56.64%	595	2.28%	308	1.18%	-4,370	-16.73%	26,121	0.39%
Lawndale	Los Angeles	3,629	68.00%	1,503	28.16%	149	2.79%	56	1.05%	2,126	39.84%	5,337	5.41%
Lomita	Los Angeles	2,775	48.91%	2,586	45.58%	219	3.86%	94	1.66%	189	3.33%	5,674	-0.88%
Long Beach	Los Angeles	64,390	63.04%	32,388	31.71%	4,244	4.15%	1,127	1.10%	32,002	31.33%	102,149	13.23%
Los Angeles	Los Angeles	574,300	73.13%	174,693	22.25%	28,552	3.64%	7,745	0.99%	399,607	50.89%	785,290	7.20%
Lynwood	Los Angeles	8,134	89.39%	819	9.00%	96	1.06%	50	0.55%	7,315	80.39%	9,099	-1.78%
Malibu	Los Angeles	2,902	57.67%	1,826	36.29%	251	4.99%	53	1.05%	1,076	21.38%	5,032	5.24%
Manhattan Beach	Los Angeles	7,203	48.55%	6,925	46.67%	552	3.72%	157	1.06%	278	1.87%	14,837	2.13%
Maywood	Los Angeles	2,742	86.25%	375	11.80%	42	1.32%	20	0.63%	2,367	74.46%	3,179	3.05%
Monrovia	Los Angeles	5,509	53.05%	4,407	42.44%	348	3.35%	120	1.16%	1,102	10.61%	10,384	1.60%
Montebello	Los Angeles	10,201	73.64%	3,208	23.16%	335	2.42%	109	0.79%	6,993	50.48%	13,853	2.29%
Monterey Park	Los Angeles	8,025	66.43%	3,665	30.34%	294	2.43%	97	0.80%	4,360	36.09%	12,081	2.71%
Norwalk	Los Angeles	13,327	67.00%	5,944	29.88%	416	2.09%	204	1.03%	7,383	37.12%	19,891	2.32%
Palmdale	Los Angeles	11,817	49.59%	11,266	47.27%	501	2.10%	247	1.04%	551	2.31%	23,831	4.88%
Palos Verdes Estates	Los Angeles	1,939	35.01%	3,421	61.76%	137	2.47%	42	0.76%	-1,482	-26.76%	5,539	2.64%
Paramount	Los Angeles	6,032	79.59%	1,353	17.85%	129	1.70%	65	0.86%	4,679	61.74%	7,579	3.80%
Pasadena	Los Angeles	24,703	63.28%	12,244	31.37%	1,729	4.43%	361	0.92%	12,459	31.92%	39,037	5.91%
Pico Rivera	Los Angeles	12,086	77.94%	3,031	19.55%	285	1.84%	105	0.68%	9,055	58.39%	15,507	-0.22%
Pomona	Los Angeles	16,556	68.24%	6,877	28.35%	609	2.51%	219	0.90%	9,679	39.90%	24,261	3.04%
Rancho Palos Verdes	Los Angeles	6,113	41.32%	8,123	54.91%	424	2.87%	133	0.90%	-2,010	-13.59%	14,793	4.30%
Redondo Beach	Los Angeles	12,063	52.48%	9,599	41.76%	1,004	4.37%	318	1.38%	2,464	10.72%	22,984	0.66%
Rolling Hills	Los Angeles	175	23.15%	559	73.94%	15	1.98%	7	0.93%	-384	-50.79%	756	-0.91%
Rolling Hills Estates	Los Angeles	1,061	34.58%	1,890	61.60%	90	2.93%	27	0.88%	-829	-27.02%	3,068	1.56%
Rosemead	Los Angeles	6,051	71.33%	2,162	25.49%	185	2.18%	85	1.00%	3,889	45.84%	8,483	3.83%
San Dimas	Los Angeles	4,707	42.50%	5,952	53.74%	307	2.77%	109	0.98%	-1,245	-11.24%	11,075	-3.45%
San Fernando	Los Angeles	3,067	76.10%	830	20.60%	76	1.89%	57	1.41%	2,237	55.51%	4,030	-0.47%
San Gabriel	Los Angeles	4,625	59.69%	2,833	36.56%	212	2.74%	78	1.01%	1,792	23.13%	7,748	2.25%
San Marino	Los Angeles	1,215	31.75%	2,499	65.30%	90	2.35%	23	0.60%	-1,284	-33.55%	3,827	8.36%
Santa Clarita	Los Angeles	18,607	41.56%	24,411	54.53%	1,242	2.77%	509	1.14%	-5,804	-12.96%	44,769	-2.64%
Santa Fe Springs	Los Angeles	3,064	70.24%	1,196	27.42%	64	1.47%	38	0.87%	1,868	42.82%	4,362	-1.77%
Santa Monica	Los Angeles	23,996	71.48%	7,114	21.19%	2,117	6.31%	342	1.02%	16,882	50.29%	33,569	9.07%
Sierra Madre	Los Angeles	2,232	46.30%	2,276	47.21%	248	5.14%	65	1.35%	-44	-0.91%	4,821	3.82%
Signal Hill	Los Angeles	1,566	65.11%	721	29.98%	94	3.91%	24	1.00%	845	35.14%	2,405	6.38%
South El Monte	Los Angeles	2,426	80.15%	527	17.41%	58	1.92%	16	0.53%	1,899	62.74%	3,027	-1.64%
South Gate	Los Angeles	11,669	80.88%	2,437	16.89%	228	1.58%	94	0.65%	9,232	63.99%	14,428	3.72%
South Pasadena	Los Angeles	4,939	57.58%	3,070	35.79%	487	5.68%	81	0.94%	1,869	21.79%	8,577	6.54%
Temple City	Los Angeles	4,648	50.85%	4,108	44.94%	286	3.13%	99	1.08%	540	5.91%	9,141	3.05%
Torrance	Los Angeles	19,631	45.55%	21,485	49.85%	1,459	3.39%	525	1.22%	-1,854	-4.30%	43,100	-13.00%
Walnut	Los Angeles	4,091	53.39%	3,344	43.64%	167	2.18%	61	0.80%	747	9.75%	7,663	0.47%
West Covina	Los Angeles	15,313	60.14%	9,324	36.62%	565	2.22%	262	1.03%	5,989	23.52%	25,464	6.24%
West Hollywood	Los Angeles	11,516	85.05%	1,355	10.01%	571	4.22%	99	0.73%	10,161	75.04%	13,541	5.72%
Westlake Village	Los Angeles	1,500	44.86%	1,743	52.12%	82	2.45%	19	0.57%	-243	-7.27%	3,344	2.26%
Whittier	Los Angeles	11,632	50.63%	10,366	45.12%	713	3.10%	262	1.14%	1,266	5.51%	22,973	3.73%
Unincorporated area	Los Angeles	145,092	65.38%	69,100	31.14%	5,598	2.52%	2,137	0.96%	75,992	34.24%	221,927	1.98%
Unapportioned absentees	Los Angeles	295,380	55.77%	212,538	40.13%	14,250	2.69%	7,506	1.42%	82,842	15.64%	529,674	11.29%
Chowchilla	Madera	691	35.55%	1,190	61.21%	43	2.21%	20	1.03%	-499	-25.67%	1,944	-9.90%
Madera	Madera	3,794	47.17%	3,984	49.53%	175	2.18%	90	1.12%	-190	-2.36%	8,043	-7.67%
Unincorporated area	Madera	7,165	30.61%	15,109	64.55%	862	3.68%	272	1.16%	-7,944	-33.94%	23,408	-8.91%
Belvedere	Marin	625	46.64%	666	49.70%	44	3.28%	5	0.37%	-41	-3.06%	1,340	5.81%
Corte Madera	Marin	3,386	68.88%	1,183	24.06%	309	6.29%	38	0.77%	2,203	44.81%	4,916	7.60%
Fairfax	Marin	3,128	73.34%	571	13.39%	533	12.50%	33	0.77%	2,557	59.95%	4,265	6.16%
Larkspur	Marin	4,528	65.46%	1,995	28.84%	350	5.06%	44	0.64%	2,533	36.62%	6,917	9.28%
Mill Valley	Marin	5,756	71.99%	1,647	20.60%	552	6.90%	41	0.51%	4,109	51.39%	7,996	4.44%
Novato	Marin	12,759	58.17%	7,983	36.39%	1,030	4.70%	163	0.74%	4,776	21.77%	21,935	3.84%
Ross	Marin	740	52.19%	592	41.75%	78	5.50%	8	0.56%	148	10.44%	1,418	5.76%
San Anselmo	Marin	5,071	72.35%	1,295	18.48%	604	8.62%	39	0.56%	3,776	53.87%	7,009	6.82%
San Rafael	Marin	15,268	64.54%	6,689	28.28%	1,519	6.42%	179	0.76%	8,579	36.27%	23,655	7.42%
Sausalito	Marin	2,945	67.73%	1,067	24.54%	303	6.97%	33	0.76%	1,878	43.19%	4,348	6.26%
Tiburon	Marin	2,886	58.98%	1,800	36.79%	187	3.82%	20	0.41%	1,086	22.19%	4,893	4.40%
Unincorporated area	Marin	22,043	63.96%	9,384	27.23%	2,780	8.07%	256	0.74%	12,659	36.73%	34,463	6.23%
Unincorporated area	Mariposa	2,816	34.88%	4,727	58.55%	379	4.69%	152	1.88%	-1,911	-23.67%	8,074	-10.38%
Fort Bragg	Mendocino	1,343	53.21%	765	30.31%	380	15.06%	36	1.43%	578	22.90%	2,524	-6.80%
Point Arena	Mendocino	104	63.80%	38	23.31%	20	12.27%	1	0.61%	66	40.49%	163	29.45%
Ukiah	Mendocino	2,719	50.22%	2,121	39.18%	524	9.68%	50	0.92%	598	11.05%	5,414	-5.21%
Willits	Mendocino	778	48.59%	597	37.29%	202	12.62%	24	1.50%	181	11.31%	1,601	-7.47%
Unincorporated area	Mendocino	11,690	47.31%	8,751	35.42%	3,925	15.89%	342	1.38%	2,939	11.89%	24,708	-2.29%
Atwater	Merced	2,534	42.25%	3,255	54.27%	155	2.58%	54	0.90%	-721	-12.02%	5,998	-6.13%
Dos Palos	Merced	429	40.51%	605	57.13%	14	1.32%	11	1.04%	-176	-16.62%	1,059	-23.51%
Gustine	Merced	716	54.78%	559	42.77%	22	1.68%	10	0.77%	157	12.01%	1,307	-13.90%
Livingston	Merced	1,058	74.25%	344	24.14%	18	1.26%	5	0.35%	714	50.11%	1,425	-5.94%
Los Banos	Merced	3,310	52.51%	2,806	44.51%	126	2.00%	62	0.98%	504	7.99%	6,304	-8.42%
Merced	Merced	7,231	47.58%	7,404	48.71%	426	2.80%	138	0.91%	-173	-1.14%	15,199	-6.65%
Unincorporated area	Merced	7,448	38.94%	11,129	58.19%	405	2.12%	144	0.75%	-3,681	-19.25%	19,126	-10.98%
Alturas	Modoc	225	27.41%	563	68.57%	25	3.05%	8	0.97%	-338	-41.17%	821	-40.66%
Unincorporated area	Modoc	499	20.43%	1,827	74.82%	71	2.91%	45	1.84%	-1,328	-54.38%	2,442	-25.32%
Unapportioned absentees	Modoc	221	26.18%	579	68.60%	26	3.08%	18	2.13%	-358	-42.42%	844	-21.06%
Mammoth Lakes	Mono	959	45.54%	991	47.06%	131	6.22%	25	1.19%	-32	-1.52%	2,106	-8.62%
Unincorporated area	Mono	829	36.60%	1,305	57.62%	99	4.37%	32	1.41%	-476	-21.02%	2,265	-6.37%
Carmel-by-the-Sea	Monterey	1,362	49.37%	1,215	44.04%	158	5.73%	24	0.87%	147	5.33%	2,759	-1.13%
Del Rey Oaks	Monterey	517	57.06%	319	35.21%	56	6.18%	14	1.55%	198	21.85%	906	6.45%
Gonzales	Monterey	1,017	72.64%	352	25.14%	22	1.57%	9	0.64%	665	47.50%	1,400	-0.13%
Greenfield	Monterey	1,414	77.14%	367	20.02%	37	2.02%	15	0.82%	1,047	57.12%	1,833	15.31%
King City	Monterey	1,056	58.60%	701	38.90%	27	1.50%	18	1.00%	355	19.70%	1,802	10.94%
Marina	Monterey	3,457	59.38%	2,063	35.43%	240	4.12%	62	1.06%	1,394	23.94%	5,822	-0.06%
Monterey	Monterey	6,725	58.09%	4,061	35.08%	689	5.95%	101	0.87%	2,664	23.01%	11,576	3.80%
Pacific Grove	Monterey	5,085	61.29%	2,562	30.88%	571	6.88%	79	0.95%	2,523	30.41%	8,297	4.70%
Salinas	Monterey	20,894	62.98%	11,095	33.44%	879	2.65%	306	0.92%	9,799	29.54%	33,174	4.00%
Sand City	Monterey	51	67.11%	16	21.05%	9	11.84%	0	0.00%	35	46.05%	76	26.05%
Seaside	Monterey	4,974	67.96%	1,954	26.70%	314	4.29%	77	1.05%	3,020	41.26%	7,319	0.60%
Soledad	Monterey	1,572	76.80%	421	20.57%	37	1.81%	17	0.83%	1,151	56.23%	2,047	0.37%
Unincorporated area	Monterey	19,494	48.11%	18,635	45.99%	2,020	4.98%	374	0.92%	859	2.12%	40,523	3.37%
American Canyon	Napa	2,144	63.06%	1,115	32.79%	108	3.18%	33	0.97%	1,029	30.26%	3,400	0.25%
Calistoga	Napa	1,010	55.68%	631	34.79%	154	8.49%	19	1.05%	379	20.89%	1,814	-0.80%
Napa	Napa	16,446	56.20%	11,203	38.29%	1,342	4.59%	270	0.92%	5,243	17.92%	29,261	-3.03%
St. Helena	Napa	1,424	55.49%	975	38.00%	142	5.53%	25	0.97%	449	17.50%	2,566	-4.10%
Yountville	Napa	1,019	59.11%	593	34.40%	91	5.28%	21	1.22%	426	24.71%	1,724	-1.95%
Unincorporated area	Napa	6,054	46.72%	6,116	47.19%	634	4.89%	155	1.20%	-62	-0.48%	12,959	-3.95%
Grass Valley	Nevada	1,856	40.61%	2,308	50.50%	353	7.72%	53	1.16%	-452	-9.89%	4,570	-18.21%
Nevada City	Nevada	791	48.56%	614	37.69%	209	12.83%	15	0.92%	177	10.87%	1,629	12.78%
Truckee	Nevada	2,882	49.69%	2,486	42.86%	357	6.16%	75	1.29%	396	6.83%	5,800	3.27%
Unincorporated area	Nevada	12,141	34.22%	20,590	58.03%	2,368	6.67%	381	1.07%	-8,449	-23.81%	35,480	-3.66%
Anaheim	Orange	34,787	43.93%	41,401	52.28%	2,024	2.56%	982	1.24%	-6,614	-8.35%	79,194	0.13%
Brea	Orange	5,408	34.59%	9,649	61.71%	419	2.68%	160	1.02%	-4,241	-27.12%	15,636	-6.43%
Buena Park	Orange	9,862	47.05%	10,332	49.29%	514	2.45%	253	1.21%	-470	-2.24%	20,961	-2.37%
Costa Mesa	Orange	13,733	40.06%	18,556	54.13%	1,433	4.18%	557	1.62%	-4,823	-14.07%	34,279	-0.88%
Cypress	Orange	7,684	42.00%	9,893	54.08%	520	2.84%	197	1.08%	-2,209	-12.07%	18,294	-4.28%
Dana Point	Orange	5,999	36.85%	9,526	58.51%	564	3.46%	191	1.17%	-3,527	-21.66%	16,280	-1.38%
Fountain Valley	Orange	8,892	37.05%	14,191	59.12%	661	2.75%	259	1.08%	-5,299	-22.08%	24,003	-4.25%
Fullerton	Orange	16,999	40.00%	23,585	55.50%	1,365	3.21%	546	1.28%	-6,586	-15.50%	42,495	-2.40%
Garden Grove	Orange	20,483	46.16%	22,257	50.16%	1,067	2.40%	564	1.27%	-1,774	-4.00%	44,371	-0.17%
Huntington Beach	Orange	31,800	38.53%	46,742	56.63%	2,907	3.52%	1,091	1.32%	-14,942	-18.10%	82,540	-3.75%
Irvine	Orange	24,314	43.75%	29,045	52.26%	1,723	3.10%	496	0.89%	-4,731	-8.51%	55,578	1.24%
La Habra	Orange	7,312	43.25%	8,964	53.03%	435	2.57%	194	1.15%	-1,652	-9.77%	16,905	-0.99%
La Palma	Orange	2,468	43.00%	3,091	53.85%	135	2.35%	46	0.80%	-623	-10.85%	5,740	-4.44%
Laguna Beach	Orange	6,874	52.45%	5,504	42.00%	583	4.45%	145	1.11%	1,370	10.45%	13,106	1.33%
Laguna Hills	Orange	4,328	35.90%	7,278	60.37%	312	2.59%	137	1.14%	-2,950	-24.47%	12,055	-1.72%
Laguna Niguel	Orange	10,232	36.54%	16,820	60.06%	731	2.61%	220	0.79%	-6,588	-23.53%	28,003	-0.07%
Laguna Woods	Orange	7,258	54.33%	5,651	42.30%	326	2.44%	124	0.93%	1,607	12.03%	13,359	N/A
Lake Forest	Orange	10,968	36.13%	18,386	60.56%	673	2.22%	332	1.09%	-7,418	-24.43%	30,359	-3.69%
Los Alamitos	Orange	1,919	42.97%	2,337	52.33%	155	3.47%	55	1.23%	-418	-9.36%	4,466	-3.84%
Mission Viejo	Orange	15,366	35.49%	26,482	61.16%	1,042	2.41%	407	0.94%	-11,116	-25.67%	43,297	-1.80%
Newport Beach	Orange	11,647	30.78%	24,865	65.71%	996	2.63%	333	0.88%	-13,218	-34.93%	37,841	-1.27%
Orange	Orange	16,615	36.41%	27,169	59.54%	1,295	2.84%	549	1.20%	-10,554	-23.13%	45,628	-1.96%
Placentia	Orange	6,674	37.29%	10,580	59.12%	458	2.56%	185	1.03%	-3,906	-21.82%	17,897	-3.19%
Rancho Santa Margarita	Orange	6,117	33.70%	11,508	63.40%	342	1.88%	184	1.01%	-5,391	-29.70%	18,151	N/A
San Clemente	Orange	7,349	33.18%	13,850	62.53%	687	3.10%	262	1.18%	-6,501	-29.35%	22,148	-1.82%
San Juan Capistrano	Orange	4,425	33.85%	8,135	62.23%	358	2.74%	154	1.18%	-3,710	-28.38%	13,072	-0.91%
Santa Ana	Orange	31,291	59.85%	19,293	36.90%	1,092	2.09%	606	1.16%	11,998	22.95%	52,282	5.27%
Seal Beach	Orange	6,487	45.24%	7,151	49.87%	522	3.64%	178	1.24%	-664	-4.63%	14,338	-1.36%
Stanton	Orange	3,752	51.41%	3,273	44.85%	174	2.38%	99	1.36%	479	6.56%	7,298	-3.14%
Tustin	Orange	7,842	39.97%	11,058	56.36%	492	2.51%	228	1.16%	-3,216	-16.39%	19,620	-1.67%
Villa Park	Orange	782	22.29%	2,654	75.63%	45	1.28%	28	0.80%	-1,872	-53.35%	3,509	-0.43%
Westminster	Orange	11,453	42.73%	14,439	53.87%	630	2.35%	282	1.05%	-2,986	-11.14%	26,804	-4.14%
Yorba Linda	Orange	8,127	28.95%	19,068	67.93%	605	2.16%	269	0.96%	-10,941	-38.98%	28,069	-4.54%
Unincorporated area	Orange	22,572	35.64%	38,566	60.90%	1,548	2.44%	641	1.01%	-15,994	-25.26%	63,327	-7.57%
Auburn	Placer	2,559	40.47%	3,417	54.04%	289	4.57%	58	0.92%	-858	-13.57%	6,323	-5.08%
Colfax	Placer	259	40.41%	319	49.77%	53	8.27%	10	1.56%	-60	-9.36%	641	-18.06%
Lincoln	Placer	1,755	37.15%	2,781	58.87%	146	3.09%	42	0.89%	-1,026	-21.72%	4,724	-19.36%
Loomis	Placer	927	31.51%	1,857	63.12%	118	4.01%	40	1.36%	-930	-31.61%	2,942	-15.96%
Rocklin	Placer	5,908	34.36%	10,628	61.82%	524	3.05%	132	0.77%	-4,720	-27.45%	17,192	-7.71%
Roseville	Placer	13,732	37.61%	21,451	58.75%	1,065	2.92%	265	0.73%	-7,719	-21.14%	36,513	-6.83%
Unincorporated area	Placer	17,309	34.99%	29,382	59.40%	2,254	4.56%	519	1.05%	-12,073	-24.41%	49,464	-7.00%
Portola	Plumas	375	43.50%	415	48.14%	43	4.99%	29	3.36%	-40	-4.64%	862	-11.51%
Unincorporated area	Plumas	3,083	32.32%	5,928	62.14%	413	4.33%	115	1.21%	-2,845	-29.82%	9,539	-14.43%
Banning	Riverside	4,012	47.35%	4,176	49.29%	210	2.48%	75	0.89%	-164	-1.94%	8,473	-4.43%
Beaumont	Riverside	1,253	45.46%	1,349	48.95%	89	3.23%	65	2.36%	-96	-3.48%	2,756	-3.29%
Blythe	Riverside	1,285	48.60%	1,278	48.34%	34	1.29%	47	1.78%	7	0.26%	2,644	-10.66%
Calimesa	Riverside	1,239	39.79%	1,747	56.10%	93	2.99%	35	1.12%	-508	-16.31%	3,114	-7.40%
Canyon Lake	Riverside	1,383	30.09%	3,106	67.58%	72	1.57%	35	0.76%	-1,723	-37.49%	4,596	-3.88%
Cathedral City	Riverside	5,243	53.79%	4,115	42.21%	277	2.84%	113	1.16%	1,128	11.57%	9,748	4.49%
Coachella	Riverside	2,084	84.27%	331	13.38%	17	0.69%	41	1.66%	1,753	70.89%	2,473	-3.45%
Corona	Riverside	15,051	42.48%	19,268	54.38%	754	2.13%	360	1.02%	-4,217	-11.90%	35,433	-4.85%
Desert Hot Springs	Riverside	1,608	49.78%	1,387	42.94%	147	4.55%	88	2.72%	221	6.84%	3,230	-0.23%
Hemet	Riverside	8,958	43.22%	11,006	53.10%	512	2.47%	250	1.21%	-2,048	-9.88%	20,726	-7.11%
Indian Wells	Riverside	547	23.56%	1,737	74.81%	27	1.16%	11	0.47%	-1,190	-51.25%	2,322	0.90%
Indio	Riverside	4,706	59.89%	2,924	37.21%	154	1.96%	74	0.94%	1,782	22.68%	7,858	0.67%
La Quinta	Riverside	2,990	35.84%	5,078	60.87%	214	2.57%	61	0.73%	-2,088	-25.03%	8,343	-23.46%
Lake Elsinore	Riverside	3,108	44.34%	3,644	51.98%	174	2.48%	84	1.20%	-536	-7.65%	7,010	16.27%
Moreno Valley	Riverside	19,589	55.79%	14,377	40.94%	822	2.34%	325	0.93%	5,212	14.84%	35,113	1.22%
Murrieta	Riverside	5,690	32.59%	11,268	64.53%	354	2.03%	149	0.85%	-5,578	-31.95%	17,461	-6.94%
Norco	Riverside	2,518	34.17%	4,608	62.52%	163	2.21%	81	1.10%	-2,090	-28.36%	7,370	-11.39%
Palm Desert	Riverside	6,461	38.78%	9,645	57.89%	404	2.42%	152	0.91%	-3,184	-19.11%	16,662	2.82%
Palm Springs	Riverside	9,207	56.76%	6,331	39.03%	549	3.38%	134	0.83%	2,876	17.73%	16,221	9.76%
Perris	Riverside	3,891	62.61%	2,121	34.13%	117	1.88%	86	1.38%	1,770	28.48%	6,215	1.71%
Rancho Mirage	Riverside	2,714	42.41%	3,520	55.00%	115	1.80%	51	0.80%	-806	-12.59%	6,400	5.99%
Riverside	Riverside	36,168	49.81%	33,240	45.78%	2,442	3.36%	764	1.05%	2,928	4.03%	72,614	-2.76%
San Jacinto	Riverside	2,940	44.37%	3,438	51.89%	176	2.66%	72	1.09%	-498	-7.52%	6,626	-8.37%
Temecula	Riverside	6,513	32.83%	12,702	64.03%	438	2.21%	184	0.93%	-6,189	-31.20%	19,837	-3.90%
Unincorporated area	Riverside	53,418	41.77%	69,559	54.39%	3,324	2.60%	1,581	1.24%	-16,141	-12.62%	127,882	-6.42%
Citrus Heights	Sacramento	12,862	40.77%	17,105	54.22%	1,122	3.56%	459	1.45%	-4,243	-13.45%	31,548	N/A
Elk Grove	Sacramento	13,667	45.00%	15,518	51.09%	876	2.88%	311	1.02%	-1,851	-6.09%	30,372	N/A
Folsom	Sacramento	7,638	35.90%	12,922	60.74%	558	2.62%	155	0.73%	-5,284	-24.84%	21,273	-7.30%
Galt	Sacramento	2,479	41.50%	3,221	53.92%	185	3.10%	89	1.49%	-742	-12.42%	5,974	-7.37%
Isleton	Sacramento	220	68.54%	94	29.28%	3	0.93%	4	1.25%	126	39.25%	321	6.47%
Sacramento	Sacramento	80,551	62.04%	40,759	31.39%	6,895	5.31%	1,635	1.26%	39,792	30.65%	129,840	-2.00%
Unincorporated area	Sacramento	95,375	44.94%	106,000	49.95%	8,020	3.78%	2,825	1.33%	-10,625	-5.01%	212,220	-4.69%
Hollister	San Benito	5,865	62.27%	3,241	34.41%	243	2.58%	69	0.73%	2,624	27.86%	9,418	0.82%
San Juan Bautista	San Benito	382	59.69%	214	33.44%	35	5.47%	9	1.41%	168	26.25%	640	-0.34%
Unincorporated area	San Benito	2,884	42.58%	3,560	52.56%	257	3.79%	72	1.06%	-676	-9.98%	6,773	-1.65%
Adelanto	San Bernardino	1,492	49.34%	1,410	46.63%	64	2.12%	58	1.92%	82	2.71%	3,024	-3.66%
Apple Valley	San Bernardino	6,235	33.87%	11,460	62.25%	433	2.35%	281	1.53%	-5,225	-28.38%	18,409	-5.36%
Barstow	San Bernardino	2,671	48.48%	2,614	47.45%	153	2.78%	71	1.29%	57	1.03%	5,509	-13.69%
Big Bear Lake	San Bernardino	790	30.93%	1,614	63.19%	100	3.92%	50	1.96%	-824	-32.26%	2,554	-8.89%
Chino	San Bernardino	8,575	48.98%	8,436	48.18%	342	1.95%	155	0.89%	139	0.79%	17,508	-1.18%
Chino Hills	San Bernardino	9,575	43.06%	12,069	54.28%	386	1.74%	206	0.93%	-2,494	-11.22%	22,236	-1.89%
Colton	San Bernardino	6,753	66.53%	3,033	29.88%	214	2.11%	151	1.49%	3,720	36.65%	10,151	-1.29%
Fontana	San Bernardino	15,435	61.72%	8,765	35.05%	492	1.97%	316	1.26%	6,670	26.67%	25,008	1.60%
Grand Terrace	San Bernardino	1,891	44.08%	2,220	51.75%	117	2.73%	62	1.45%	-329	-7.67%	4,290	-3.08%
Hesperia	San Bernardino	6,390	36.99%	10,130	58.64%	421	2.44%	333	1.93%	-3,740	-21.65%	17,274	-6.04%
Highland	San Bernardino	5,770	49.75%	5,373	46.32%	295	2.54%	161	1.39%	397	3.42%	11,599	-3.21%
Loma Linda	San Bernardino	2,465	42.73%	3,050	52.87%	180	3.12%	74	1.28%	-585	-10.14%	5,769	1.32%
Montclair	San Bernardino	4,216	60.33%	2,531	36.22%	146	2.09%	95	1.36%	1,685	24.11%	6,988	5.38%
Needles	San Bernardino	713	53.41%	530	39.70%	47	3.52%	45	3.37%	183	13.71%	1,335	-7.30%
Ontario	San Bernardino	18,129	55.08%	13,582	41.27%	758	2.30%	444	1.35%	4,547	13.82%	32,913	0.69%
Rancho Cucamonga	San Bernardino	18,637	42.85%	23,268	53.49%	1,046	2.40%	545	1.25%	-4,631	-10.65%	43,496	-1.43%
Redlands	San Bernardino	10,485	42.21%	13,186	53.08%	835	3.36%	336	1.35%	-2,701	-10.87%	24,842	-2.46%
Rialto	San Bernardino	12,932	67.25%	5,659	29.43%	387	2.01%	252	1.31%	7,273	37.82%	19,230	2.69%
San Bernardino	San Bernardino	23,100	60.17%	13,702	35.69%	950	2.47%	640	1.67%	9,398	24.48%	38,392	0.09%
Twentynine Palms	San Bernardino	1,241	35.69%	2,074	59.65%	102	2.93%	60	1.73%	-833	-23.96%	3,477	-15.49%
Upland	San Bernardino	10,179	41.39%	13,398	54.48%	688	2.80%	327	1.33%	-3,219	-13.09%	24,592	0.57%
Victorville	San Bernardino	7,490	44.95%	8,554	51.33%	348	2.09%	272	1.63%	-1,064	-6.39%	16,664	-4.16%
Yucaipa	San Bernardino	5,647	37.10%	8,855	58.18%	515	3.38%	203	1.33%	-3,208	-21.08%	15,220	-7.77%
Yucca Valley	San Bernardino	2,131	36.17%	3,463	58.78%	194	3.29%	103	1.75%	-1,332	-22.61%	5,891	-7.91%
Unincorporated area	San Bernardino	31,807	40.51%	42,781	54.48%	2,562	3.26%	1,371	1.75%	-10,974	-13.98%	78,521	-4.34%
Carlsbad	San Diego	14,873	40.52%	20,220	55.08%	1,267	3.45%	348	0.95%	-5,347	-14.57%	36,708	-1.87%
Chula Vista	San Diego	25,857	50.98%	22,860	45.07%	1,446	2.85%	557	1.10%	2,997	5.91%	50,720	-4.34%
Coronado	San Diego	2,823	32.30%	5,556	63.56%	297	3.40%	65	0.74%	-2,733	-31.27%	8,741	-1.50%
Del Mar	San Diego	1,331	50.17%	1,183	44.59%	113	4.26%	26	0.98%	148	5.58%	2,653	-0.79%
El Cajon	San Diego	10,820	39.91%	15,064	55.56%	792	2.92%	435	1.60%	-4,244	-15.65%	27,111	-7.57%
Encinitas	San Diego	12,864	48.03%	12,092	45.15%	1,497	5.59%	328	1.22%	772	2.88%	26,781	1.35%
Escondido	San Diego	13,385	36.13%	22,007	59.41%	1,124	3.03%	527	1.42%	-8,622	-23.28%	37,043	-5.64%
Imperial Beach	San Diego	3,112	49.31%	2,823	44.73%	304	4.82%	72	1.14%	289	4.58%	6,311	-4.18%
La Mesa	San Diego	10,832	46.65%	11,071	47.68%	989	4.26%	326	1.40%	-239	-1.03%	23,218	-0.59%
Lemon Grove	San Diego	4,144	50.82%	3,611	44.29%	268	3.29%	131	1.61%	533	6.54%	8,154	-5.02%
National City	San Diego	6,137	64.44%	3,111	32.67%	181	1.90%	94	0.99%	3,026	31.78%	9,523	-6.34%
Oceanside	San Diego	21,697	42.45%	27,005	52.83%	1,722	3.37%	693	1.36%	-5,308	-10.38%	51,117	-3.54%
Poway	San Diego	7,362	34.90%	12,921	61.26%	586	2.78%	223	1.06%	-5,559	-26.36%	21,092	-3.39%
San Diego	San Diego	221,579	52.90%	176,616	42.16%	16,342	3.90%	4,360	1.04%	44,963	10.73%	418,897	-0.05%
San Marcos	San Diego	6,776	39.39%	9,691	56.33%	496	2.88%	241	1.40%	-2,915	-16.94%	17,204	-5.60%
Santee	San Diego	7,852	37.20%	12,354	58.53%	625	2.96%	277	1.31%	-4,502	-21.33%	21,108	-9.63%
Solana Beach	San Diego	2,940	43.92%	3,440	51.39%	255	3.81%	59	0.88%	-500	-7.47%	6,694	1.55%
Vista	San Diego	9,135	38.57%	13,397	56.56%	790	3.34%	364	1.54%	-4,262	-17.99%	23,686	-1.76%
Unincorporated area	San Diego	54,147	33.45%	100,714	62.22%	4,885	3.02%	2,123	1.31%	-46,567	-28.77%	161,869	-5.34%
San Francisco	San Francisco	241,578	75.55%	51,496	16.10%	24,828	7.76%	1,869	0.58%	190,082	59.44%	319,771	2.86%
Escalon	San Joaquin	850	38.88%	1,259	57.59%	44	2.01%	33	1.51%	-409	-18.71%	2,186	-10.72%
Lathrop	San Joaquin	1,576	56.43%	1,143	40.92%	48	1.72%	26	0.93%	433	15.50%	2,793	-7.51%
Lodi	San Joaquin	6,962	35.07%	12,098	60.95%	612	3.08%	177	0.89%	-5,136	-25.88%	19,849	-7.95%
Manteca	San Joaquin	6,829	44.48%	8,013	52.20%	353	2.30%	157	1.02%	-1,184	-7.71%	15,352	-5.03%
Ripon	San Joaquin	1,094	26.86%	2,894	71.05%	58	1.42%	27	0.66%	-1,800	-44.19%	4,073	-10.12%
Stockton	San Joaquin	36,779	57.45%	25,124	39.25%	1,595	2.49%	519	0.81%	11,655	18.21%	64,017	1.29%
Tracy	San Joaquin	8,970	51.04%	8,031	45.70%	431	2.45%	142	0.81%	939	5.34%	17,574	-0.50%
Unincorporated area	San Joaquin	16,716	40.38%	23,211	56.07%	1,054	2.55%	414	1.00%	-6,495	-15.69%	41,395	-6.42%
Arroyo Grande	San Luis Obispo	3,304	39.68%	4,611	55.37%	345	4.14%	67	0.80%	-1,307	-15.70%	8,327	-1.74%
Atascadero	San Luis Obispo	4,129	35.76%	6,692	57.95%	620	5.37%	106	0.92%	-2,563	-22.20%	11,547	-6.40%
El Paso de Robles	San Luis Obispo	3,091	34.85%	5,390	60.77%	304	3.43%	84	0.95%	-2,299	-25.92%	8,869	-7.47%
Grover City	San Luis Obispo	2,154	45.25%	2,309	48.51%	245	5.15%	52	1.09%	-155	-3.26%	4,760	-5.93%
Morro Bay	San Luis Obispo	2,629	47.89%	2,371	43.19%	443	8.07%	47	0.86%	258	4.70%	5,490	-2.08%
Pismo Beach	San Luis Obispo	1,902	40.96%	2,470	53.20%	221	4.76%	50	1.08%	-568	-12.23%	4,643	-4.42%
San Luis Obispo	San Luis Obispo	9,769	50.15%	7,853	40.32%	1,687	8.66%	170	0.87%	1,916	9.84%	19,479	-4.80%
Unincorporated area	San Luis Obispo	17,548	38.34%	25,163	54.98%	2,658	5.81%	398	0.87%	-7,615	-16.64%	45,767	-3.85%
Atherton	San Mateo	1,595	38.44%	2,409	58.06%	118	2.84%	27	0.65%	-814	-19.62%	4,149	3.78%
Belmont	San Mateo	7,317	63.03%	3,680	31.70%	500	4.31%	112	0.96%	3,637	31.33%	11,609	1.61%
Brisbane	San Mateo	1,139	69.11%	344	20.87%	149	9.04%	16	0.97%	795	48.24%	1,648	2.63%
Burlingame	San Mateo	7,575	60.78%	4,273	34.28%	527	4.23%	89	0.71%	3,302	26.49%	12,464	3.48%
Colma	San Mateo	286	75.26%	83	21.84%	10	2.63%	1	0.26%	203	53.42%	380	-2.57%
Daly City	San Mateo	18,494	74.11%	5,610	22.48%	736	2.95%	115	0.46%	12,884	51.63%	24,955	-0.10%
East Palo Alto	San Mateo	3,881	89.08%	331	7.60%	129	2.96%	16	0.37%	3,550	81.48%	4,357	-1.02%
Foster City	San Mateo	7,236	61.99%	3,998	34.25%	368	3.15%	71	0.61%	3,238	27.74%	11,673	2.52%
Half Moon Bay	San Mateo	2,876	58.65%	1,710	34.87%	271	5.53%	47	0.96%	1,166	23.78%	4,904	0.74%
Hillsborough	San Mateo	2,297	40.26%	3,259	57.13%	124	2.17%	25	0.44%	-962	-16.86%	5,705	5.35%
Menlo Park	San Mateo	8,805	62.48%	4,590	32.57%	598	4.24%	99	0.70%	4,215	29.91%	14,092	2.85%
Millbrae	San Mateo	5,156	59.98%	3,098	36.04%	284	3.30%	58	0.67%	2,058	23.94%	8,596	2.26%
Pacifica	San Mateo	11,123	68.22%	4,056	24.88%	988	6.06%	138	0.85%	7,067	43.34%	16,305	0.68%
Portola Valley	San Mateo	1,489	53.56%	1,183	42.55%	86	3.09%	22	0.79%	306	11.01%	2,780	6.61%
Redwood City	San Mateo	16,322	63.41%	8,139	31.62%	1,040	4.04%	241	0.94%	8,183	31.79%	25,742	1.49%
San Bruno	San Mateo	9,500	67.49%	3,929	27.91%	548	3.89%	100	0.71%	5,571	39.58%	14,077	0.66%
San Carlos	San Mateo	8,620	60.60%	4,971	34.95%	526	3.70%	108	0.76%	3,649	25.65%	14,225	3.00%
San Mateo	San Mateo	22,808	63.90%	11,317	31.70%	1,326	3.71%	244	0.68%	11,491	32.19%	35,695	2.40%
South San Francisco	San Mateo	13,076	71.74%	4,437	24.34%	608	3.34%	105	0.58%	8,639	47.40%	18,226	1.20%
Woodside	San Mateo	1,416	45.04%	1,586	50.45%	119	3.78%	23	0.73%	-170	-5.41%	3,144	3.40%
Unincorporated area	San Mateo	15,746	63.82%	7,293	29.56%	1,378	5.59%	256	1.04%	8,453	34.26%	24,673	2.52%
Buellton	Santa Barbara	630	41.10%	831	54.21%	57	3.72%	15	0.98%	-201	-13.11%	1,533	-6.29%
Carpinteria	Santa Barbara	2,761	52.33%	2,150	40.75%	321	6.08%	44	0.83%	611	11.58%	5,276	-6.94%
Guadalupe	Santa Barbara	881	67.61%	386	29.62%	27	2.07%	9	0.69%	495	37.99%	1,303	-1.55%
Lompoc	Santa Barbara	4,820	42.55%	6,004	53.00%	390	3.44%	115	1.02%	-1,184	-10.45%	11,329	-8.37%
Santa Barbara	Santa Barbara	21,969	58.61%	12,158	32.43%	2,976	7.94%	382	1.02%	9,811	26.17%	37,485	-0.54%
Santa Maria	Santa Barbara	7,772	41.66%	10,293	55.17%	435	2.33%	156	0.84%	-2,521	-13.51%	18,656	-7.30%
Solvang	Santa Barbara	829	32.47%	1,625	63.65%	81	3.17%	18	0.71%	-796	-31.18%	2,553	-2.02%
Unincorporated area	Santa Barbara	33,749	43.92%	38,046	49.51%	4,377	5.70%	667	0.87%	-4,297	-5.59%	76,839	-2.26%
Campbell	Santa Clara	8,309	59.23%	4,890	34.86%	553	3.94%	276	1.97%	3,419	24.37%	14,028	0.77%
Cupertino	Santa Clara	10,952	57.45%	7,173	37.63%	683	3.58%	256	1.34%	3,779	19.82%	19,064	2.64%
Gilroy	Santa Clara	6,800	59.52%	4,187	36.65%	272	2.38%	166	1.45%	2,613	22.87%	11,425	-0.87%
Los Altos	Santa Clara	8,354	53.31%	6,574	41.95%	523	3.34%	221	1.41%	1,780	11.36%	15,672	4.22%
Los Altos Hills	Santa Clara	2,084	45.54%	2,301	50.28%	145	3.17%	46	1.01%	-217	-4.74%	4,576	4.90%
Los Gatos	Santa Clara	7,871	54.35%	5,860	40.46%	569	3.93%	183	1.26%	2,011	13.89%	14,483	3.57%
Milpitas	Santa Clara	9,413	60.78%	5,479	35.38%	390	2.52%	204	1.32%	3,934	25.40%	15,486	-0.62%
Monte Sereno	Santa Clara	877	45.02%	979	50.26%	74	3.80%	18	0.92%	-102	-5.24%	1,948	3.18%
Morgan Hill	Santa Clara	6,306	51.69%	5,383	44.13%	341	2.80%	169	1.39%	923	7.57%	12,199	1.43%
Mountain View	Santa Clara	16,971	66.27%	6,912	26.99%	1,333	5.21%	391	1.53%	10,059	39.28%	25,607	2.82%
Palo Alto	Santa Clara	20,761	69.99%	6,923	23.34%	1,596	5.38%	382	1.29%	13,838	46.65%	29,662	3.91%
San Jose	Santa Clara	158,718	61.87%	86,450	33.70%	7,721	3.01%	3,642	1.42%	72,268	28.17%	256,531	0.81%
Santa Clara	Santa Clara	20,077	62.37%	10,406	32.33%	1,251	3.89%	455	1.41%	9,671	30.04%	32,189	-0.21%
Saratoga	Santa Clara	7,151	46.76%	7,568	49.49%	413	2.70%	160	1.05%	-417	-2.73%	15,292	4.78%
Sunnyvale	Santa Clara	26,144	61.44%	14,195	33.36%	1,619	3.80%	596	1.40%	11,949	28.08%	42,554	2.37%
Unincorporated area	Santa Clara	21,702	58.01%	13,470	36.00%	1,589	4.25%	652	1.74%	8,232	22.00%	37,413	1.51%
Capitola	Santa Cruz	2,965	63.06%	1,291	27.46%	399	8.49%	47	1.00%	1,674	35.60%	4,702	2.96%
Santa Cruz	Santa Cruz	18,508	66.40%	4,566	16.38%	4,531	16.26%	267	0.96%	13,942	50.02%	27,872	3.22%
Scotts Valley	Santa Cruz	2,730	49.73%	2,407	43.84%	287	5.23%	66	1.20%	323	5.88%	5,490	5.84%
Watsonville	Santa Cruz	6,324	70.38%	2,336	26.00%	273	3.04%	52	0.58%	3,988	44.39%	8,985	10.25%
Unincorporated area	Santa Cruz	36,091	58.88%	19,027	31.04%	5,354	8.73%	829	1.35%	17,064	27.84%	61,301	4.46%
Anderson	Shasta	900	35.50%	1,520	59.96%	72	2.84%	43	1.70%	-620	-24.46%	2,535	-19.60%
Redding	Shasta	9,842	31.08%	20,423	64.49%	962	3.04%	443	1.40%	-10,581	-33.41%	31,670	-10.67%
Shasta Lake	Shasta	1,185	38.26%	1,747	56.41%	113	3.65%	52	1.68%	-562	-18.15%	3,097	-15.28%
Unincorporated area	Shasta	8,200	28.04%	19,588	66.99%	984	3.37%	470	1.61%	-11,388	-38.94%	29,242	-14.12%
Loyalton	Sierra	90	30.82%	189	64.73%	7	2.40%	6	2.05%	-99	-33.90%	292	-25.21%
Unincorporated area	Sierra	295	28.75%	649	63.26%	53	5.17%	29	2.83%	-354	-34.50%	1,026	-14.44%
Unapportioned absentees	Sierra	155	29.30%	334	63.14%	26	4.91%	14	2.65%	-179	-33.84%	529	-15.34%
Dorris	Siskiyou	75	25.95%	207	71.63%	3	1.04%	4	1.38%	-132	-45.67%	289	-20.12%
Dunsmuir	Siskiyou	380	48.35%	346	44.02%	42	5.34%	18	2.29%	34	4.33%	786	-22.42%
Etna	Siskiyou	76	21.59%	250	71.02%	21	5.97%	5	1.42%	-174	-49.43%	352	-35.36%
Fort Jones	Siskiyou	70	25.00%	196	70.00%	10	3.57%	4	1.43%	-126	-45.00%	280	-24.90%
Montague	Siskiyou	101	21.22%	347	72.90%	19	3.99%	9	1.89%	-246	-51.68%	476	-53.01%
Mt. Shasta	Siskiyou	769	47.06%	713	43.64%	114	6.98%	38	2.33%	56	3.43%	1,634	-10.26%
Tulelake	Siskiyou	49	18.49%	207	78.11%	4	1.51%	5	1.89%	-158	-59.62%	265	-19.51%
Weed	Siskiyou	517	52.92%	408	41.76%	37	3.79%	15	1.54%	109	11.16%	977	-15.14%
Yreka	Siskiyou	887	29.27%	1,959	64.65%	121	3.99%	63	2.08%	-1,072	-35.38%	3,030	-21.75%
Unincorporated area	Siskiyou	3,399	28.98%	7,565	64.50%	501	4.27%	264	2.25%	-4,166	-35.52%	11,729	-18.02%
Benicia	Solano	7,415	57.56%	4,816	37.39%	543	4.22%	108	0.84%	2,599	20.18%	12,882	-2.34%
Dixon	Solano	2,612	45.91%	2,869	50.42%	161	2.83%	48	0.84%	-257	-4.52%	5,690	-5.09%
Fairfield	Solano	16,038	54.69%	12,273	41.85%	787	2.68%	228	0.78%	3,765	12.84%	29,326	-8.94%
Rio Vista	Solano	930	45.08%	1,036	50.22%	76	3.68%	21	1.02%	-106	-5.14%	2,063	-8.89%
Suisun City	Solano	4,837	60.90%	2,836	35.71%	194	2.44%	75	0.94%	2,001	25.20%	7,942	-0.51%
Vacaville	Solano	13,918	47.60%	14,137	48.35%	917	3.14%	268	0.92%	-219	-0.75%	29,240	-5.11%
Vallejo	Solano	26,074	71.24%	9,278	25.35%	946	2.58%	301	0.82%	16,796	45.89%	36,599	0.70%
Unincorporated area	Solano	3,292	41.19%	4,359	54.54%	245	3.07%	97	1.21%	-1,067	-13.35%	7,993	-3.87%
Cloverdale	Sonoma	1,549	56.18%	985	35.73%	186	6.75%	37	1.34%	564	20.46%	2,757	-2.16%
Cotati	Sonoma	1,846	64.07%	743	25.79%	265	9.20%	27	0.94%	1,103	38.29%	2,881	1.20%
Healdsburg	Sonoma	2,818	59.00%	1,581	33.10%	341	7.14%	36	0.75%	1,237	25.90%	4,776	0.10%
Petaluma	Sonoma	14,597	61.82%	7,385	31.28%	1,435	6.08%	196	0.83%	7,212	30.54%	23,613	0.79%
Rohnert Park	Sonoma	9,179	59.64%	5,113	33.22%	966	6.28%	132	0.86%	4,066	26.42%	15,390	-1.17%
Santa Rosa	Sonoma	36,318	59.80%	20,131	33.15%	3,708	6.11%	579	0.95%	16,187	26.65%	60,736	2.36%
Sebastopol	Sonoma	2,595	66.00%	837	21.29%	471	11.98%	29	0.74%	1,758	44.71%	3,932	5.17%
Sonoma	Sonoma	3,113	61.45%	1,615	31.88%	299	5.90%	39	0.77%	1,498	29.57%	5,066	1.52%
Windsor	Sonoma	5,254	56.02%	3,656	38.98%	385	4.11%	83	0.89%	1,598	17.04%	9,378	-1.97%
Unincorporated area	Sonoma	40,026	58.45%	21,483	31.37%	6,268	9.15%	700	1.02%	18,543	27.08%	68,477	1.45%
Ceres	Stanislaus	4,171	49.10%	4,005	47.15%	228	2.68%	91	1.07%	166	1.95%	8,495	-10.62%
Hughson	Stanislaus	526	41.16%	712	55.71%	32	2.50%	8	0.63%	-186	-14.55%	1,278	-10.73%
Modesto	Stanislaus	27,048	46.70%	28,684	49.53%	1,625	2.81%	559	0.97%	-1,636	-2.82%	57,916	-6.16%
Newman	Stanislaus	945	50.53%	853	45.61%	47	2.51%	25	1.34%	92	4.92%	1,870	-15.11%
Oakdale	Stanislaus	1,932	39.64%	2,766	56.75%	131	2.69%	45	0.92%	-834	-17.11%	4,874	-13.33%
Patterson	Stanislaus	1,354	52.93%	1,111	43.43%	62	2.42%	31	1.21%	243	9.50%	2,558	-7.79%
Riverbank	Stanislaus	1,855	46.80%	1,989	50.18%	79	1.99%	41	1.03%	-134	-3.38%	3,964	-9.54%
Turlock	Stanislaus	6,650	41.31%	8,883	55.19%	437	2.71%	126	0.78%	-2,233	-13.87%	16,096	-8.69%
Waterford	Stanislaus	646	38.38%	965	57.34%	46	2.73%	26	1.54%	-319	-18.95%	1,683	-21.38%
Unincorporated area	Stanislaus	11,321	38.33%	17,220	58.31%	711	2.41%	281	0.95%	-5,899	-19.97%	29,533	-16.50%
Live Oak	Sutter	634	50.00%	582	45.90%	32	2.52%	20	1.58%	52	4.10%	1,268	-5.59%
Yuba City	Sutter	3,644	34.22%	6,687	62.79%	230	2.16%	88	0.83%	-3,043	-28.58%	10,649	-10.65%
Unincorporated area	Sutter	4,138	28.25%	10,081	68.83%	332	2.27%	96	0.66%	-5,943	-40.57%	14,647	-10.58%
Corning	Tehama	605	36.05%	983	58.58%	49	2.92%	41	2.44%	-378	-22.53%	1,678	-14.73%
Red Bluff	Tehama	1,489	37.22%	2,299	57.46%	149	3.72%	64	1.60%	-810	-20.24%	4,001	-16.75%
Tehama	Tehama	68	35.60%	111	58.12%	10	5.24%	2	1.05%	-43	-22.51%	191	-23.16%
Unincorporated area	Tehama	4,345	29.00%	9,877	65.92%	489	3.26%	273	1.82%	-5,532	-36.92%	14,984	-17.66%
Unincorporated area	Trinity	1,932	33.33%	3,340	57.62%	396	6.83%	129	2.23%	-1,408	-24.29%	5,797	-18.74%
Dinuba	Tulare	1,536	48.06%	1,557	48.72%	66	2.07%	37	1.16%	-21	-0.66%	3,196	-5.82%
Exeter	Tulare	834	32.90%	1,616	63.75%	59	2.33%	26	1.03%	-782	-30.85%	2,535	-8.83%
Farmersville	Tulare	768	57.79%	521	39.20%	20	1.50%	20	1.50%	247	18.59%	1,329	-6.23%
Lindsay	Tulare	815	54.26%	649	43.21%	20	1.33%	18	1.20%	166	11.05%	1,502	-7.06%
Porterville	Tulare	3,418	40.64%	4,737	56.33%	191	2.27%	64	0.76%	-1,319	-15.68%	8,410	-8.29%
Tulare	Tulare	4,133	41.03%	5,663	56.23%	185	1.84%	91	0.90%	-1,530	-15.19%	10,072	-8.38%
Visalia	Tulare	9,807	33.30%	18,711	63.53%	693	2.35%	243	0.83%	-8,904	-30.23%	29,454	-5.72%
Woodlake	Tulare	584	62.26%	340	36.25%	7	0.75%	7	0.75%	244	26.01%	938	-1.65%
Unincorporated area	Tulare	11,111	34.31%	20,276	62.62%	593	1.83%	402	1.24%	-9,165	-28.30%	32,382	-9.56%
Sonora	Tuolumne	829	47.13%	819	46.56%	91	5.17%	20	1.14%	10	0.57%	1,759	-11.69%
Unincorporated area	Tuolumne	8,530	38.83%	12,353	56.23%	858	3.91%	227	1.03%	-3,823	-17.40%	21,968	-9.30%
Camarillo	Ventura	11,456	41.53%	15,033	54.49%	844	3.06%	255	0.92%	-3,577	-12.97%	27,588	-5.77%
Fillmore	Ventura	2,119	54.03%	1,645	41.94%	113	2.88%	45	1.15%	474	12.09%	3,922	-2.93%
Moorpark	Ventura	4,981	42.57%	6,277	53.64%	314	2.68%	130	1.11%	-1,296	-11.08%	11,702	-4.58%
Ojai	Ventura	1,902	51.64%	1,452	39.42%	291	7.90%	38	1.03%	450	12.22%	3,683	5.11%
Oxnard	Ventura	24,903	62.30%	13,555	33.91%	1,147	2.87%	367	0.92%	11,348	28.39%	39,972	-0.53%
Port Hueneme	Ventura	3,252	53.98%	2,439	40.48%	268	4.45%	66	1.10%	813	13.49%	6,025	-0.57%
Ventura	Ventura	21,584	48.51%	20,095	45.17%	2,334	5.25%	477	1.07%	1,489	3.35%	44,490	-0.61%
Santa Paula	Ventura	4,709	60.08%	2,859	36.48%	182	2.32%	88	1.12%	1,850	23.60%	7,838	0.35%
Simi Valley	Ventura	18,207	40.36%	24,925	55.25%	1,394	3.09%	587	1.30%	-6,718	-14.89%	45,113	-5.55%
Thousand Oaks	Ventura	23,200	42.60%	29,109	53.45%	1,630	2.99%	517	0.95%	-5,909	-10.85%	54,456	0.36%
Unincorporated area	Ventura	16,945	44.71%	18,784	49.56%	1,718	4.53%	456	1.20%	-1,839	-4.85%	37,903	0.75%
Davis	Yolo	17,268	64.00%	6,940	25.72%	2,582	9.57%	190	0.70%	10,328	38.28%	26,980	-2.54%
West Sacramento	Yolo	5,216	57.11%	3,377	36.97%	422	4.62%	119	1.30%	1,839	20.13%	9,134	-10.56%
Winters	Yolo	955	49.05%	867	44.53%	99	5.08%	26	1.34%	88	4.52%	1,947	-7.03%
Woodland	Yolo	7,299	45.48%	8,034	50.06%	578	3.60%	137	0.85%	-735	-4.58%	16,048	-11.07%
Unincorporated area	Yolo	3,009	41.07%	3,839	52.40%	426	5.81%	53	0.72%	-830	-11.33%	7,327	-12.12%
Marysville	Yuba	1,312	37.27%	2,045	58.10%	115	3.27%	48	1.36%	-733	-20.82%	3,520	-11.03%
Wheatland	Yuba	294	39.46%	421	56.51%	21	2.82%	9	1.21%	-127	-17.05%	745	-9.19%
Unincorporated area	Yuba	3,940	33.22%	7,372	62.15%	371	3.13%	179	1.51%	-3,432	-28.93%	11,862	-13.15%
Totals (Note: Statewide candidate vote percentages and the total vote number differ here because California's Supplement to Statement of Vote does not count write in votes as part of the city totals.)		5,861,203	53.45%	4,567,429	41.65%	418,707	3.82%	118,429	1.08%	1,293,774	11.80%	10,965,768	-1.01%

===== Cities and unincorporated areas that flipped from Republican to Democratic =====
- Martinez (Contra Costa)
- Manhattan Beach (Los Angeles)
- Palmdale (Los Angeles)
- Unincorporated area (Monterey)
- Nevada City (Nevada)

===== Cities and unincorporated areas that flipped from Democratic to Republican =====
- Livermore (Alameda)
- Pleasanton (Alameda)
- Jackson (Amador)
- Sutter Creek (Amador)
- Chico (Butte)
- Williams (Colusa)
- Moraga (Contra Costa)
- Crescent City (Del Norte)
- Fresno (Fresno)
- Unincorporated area (Humboldt)
- Holtville (Imperial)
- Imperial (Imperial)
- Unincorporated area (Inyo)
- Torrance (Los Angeles)
- Madera (Madera)
- Dos Palos (Merced)
- Merced (Merced)
- Mammoth Lakes (Mono)
- Unincorporated area (Napa)
- Grass Valley (Nevada)
- Buena Park (Orange)
- Colfax (Placer)
- Portola (Plumas)
- Banning (Riverside)
- San Jacinto (Riverside)
- Grover City (San Luis Obispo)
- Montague (Siskiyou)
- Dixon (Solano)
- Rio Vista (Solano)
- Vacaville (Solano)
- Modesto (Stanislaus)
- Riverbank (Stanislaus)
- Waterford (Stanislaus)
- Tehama (Tehama)
- Dinuba (Tulare)
- Woodland (Yolo)
- Unincorporated area (Yolo)

== Analysis ==
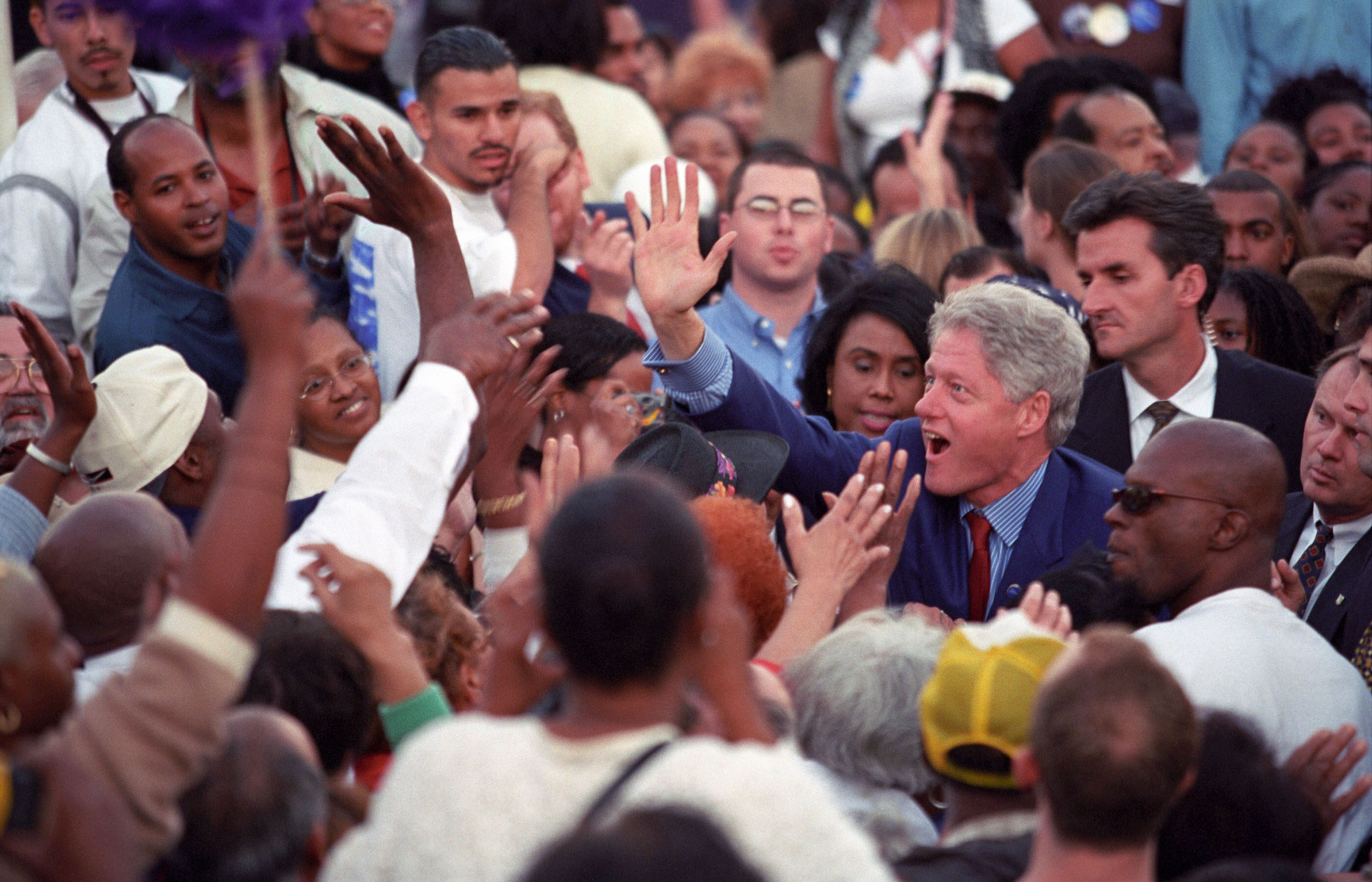
President Bill Clinton in a rally in Los Angeles on November 2, 2000

Vice President Al Gore easily defeated Texas Governor George W. Bush in California. Bush campaigned several times in California, but it did not seem to help, as Gore defeated Bush by 11.8%. Bush did make substantial headway in the Gold Country, Shasta Cascade, and parts of the Central Valley, flipping San Joaquin, Stanislaus, and Merced counties (all of which had voted for Bill Clinton twice) and winning the highest vote share of any presidential nominee in decades (exceeding California natives Richard Nixon and Ronald Reagan) in Shasta, Madera, Tehama, Siskiyou, Lassen, Plumas, Modoc, and Sierra counties. He also flipped San Bernardino County, his largest county flip in the state (and nationally), as well as Ventura County; but he underperformed in all the large, then-historically Republican counties of Southern California and the Central Coast (San Diego, Orange, Riverside, San Bernardino, Ventura, Santa Barbara, and San Luis Obispo) relative to Bob Dole's performance in 1996, losing Santa Barbara outright despite that Dole had lost it by only 4.5%. In the then-Republican bastion of Orange County, Al Gore became the first Democrat to crack 40% since Lyndon Johnson's 1964 landslide.

Furthermore, Gore overwhelmingly won Los Angeles County, the most populous county in the state and the country, and swept the Bay Area (where Bush's father had won Napa County in 1988, the last time a Republican had won the state). In San Francisco, although Bush did improve slightly on Dole's vote share, he posted the second-worst showing of any major-party nominee (after Dole) since John Davis in 1924. Even though Green Party nominee Ralph Nader broke into double digits in the North Coast counties of Mendocino and Humboldt, as well as in Santa Cruz County, these factors helped Gore win statewide by a little over 1.3 million votes, greater than his national popular vote margin over Bush (although less than the raw vote margin whereby he won New York).

Apart from Ralph Nader, Pat Buchanan, the paleoconservative former adviser to Presidents Nixon and Reagan and two-time Republican presidential candidate, was on the ballot as the nominee of the Reform Party, which had been founded by Ross Perot in 1994. However, as in most of the rest of the country, Buchanan fell well short of Perot's 1996 performance in California, cracking 1% only in Glenn County (and in tiny Alpine County, where he received eight votes). Buchanan was essentially a non-factor, and California was projected for Gore upon poll-closing, at 11 PM EST.

== Electors ==
Technically the voters of California cast their ballots for electors: representatives to the Electoral College. California is allocated 54 electors because it has 52 congressional districts and two senators. All candidates who appear on the ballot or qualify to receive write-in votes must submit a list of 54 electors, who pledge to vote for their candidate and his or her running mate. Whoever wins the majority of votes in the state is awarded all 54 electoral votes. Their chosen electors then vote for president and vice president. Although electors are pledged to their candidate and running mate, they are not obligated to vote for them. An elector who votes for someone other than his or her candidate is known as a faithless elector.

The electors of each state and the District of Columbia met on December 18, 2000, to cast their votes for president and vice president. The Electoral College itself never meets as one body. Instead, the electors from each state and the District of Columbia met in their respective capitols.

The following were the members of the Electoral College from the state. All were pledged to and voted for Al Gore and Joe Lieberman:

1. Sunil Aghi
2. Amy Arambula
3. Rachel Binah
4. R. Stephen Bollinger
5. Roberts Braden
6. Laura Karolina Capps
7. Anni Chung
8. Joseph A. Cislowski
9. Sheldon Cohn
10. Thor Emblem
11. Elsa Favila
12. John Freidenrich
13. Cecelia Fuentes
14. Glen Fuller
15. James Garrison
16. Sally Goehring
17. Florence Gold
18. Jill S. Hardy
19. Therese Horsting
20. Georgie Huff
21. Robert Eugene Hurd
22. Harriet A. Ingram
23. Robert Jordan
24. John Koza
25. John Laird
26. N. Mark Lam
27. Manuel M. Lopez
28. Henry Lozano
29. David Mann
30. Beverly Martin
31. R. Keith McDonald
32. Carol D. Norberg
33. Ron Oberndorfer
34. Gerard Orozco
35. Trudy Owens
36. Gregory S. Pettis
37. Flo Rene Pickett
38. Theodore H. Plant
39. Art Pulaski
40. Eloise Reyes
41. Alex Arthur Reza
42. C. Craig Roberts
43. Jason Rodríguez
44. Luis D. Rojas
45. Howard L. Schock
46. Lane Sherman
47. David A. Torres
48. Larry Trullinger
49. Angelo K. Tsakopoulos
50. Richard Valle
51. Karen Waters
52. Don Wilcox
53. William K. Wong
54. Rosalind Wyman
