= Twenty-Nine Palms Band of Mission Indians of California =

Native Chemehuevi Indians in Southern California

Regions with significant populations
- United States (California)

Languages
- English, Chemehuevi language

Religion
- Traditional tribal religion, Christianity (Catholicism)

Related ethnic groups
- Chemehuevi and Mission Indian tribes

The Twenty-Nine Palms Band of Mission Indians of California is a federally recognized tribe of Mission Indians with a reservation consisting of two sections, one located near the cities of Indio and Coachella in Riverside County, and the other in the city of Twentynine Palms in San Bernardino County, California. While many scholars regard the tribe as being Luiseño, the tribe itself identifies as being Chemehuevi.

== History ==
The area was settled in 1867 by a band of Chemehuevi, whose descendants formed the Twenty-Nine Palms Band. The reservation consists of two geographically separate sections, with the main one in Indio, and the other in the city of Twenty-Nine Palms at 34°07′02″N 116°03′00″W.

The portion of the Twenty-Nine Palms Reservation (33°42′38″N 116°11′12″W) in San Bernardino County was established in 1895 and occupies 402 acres (163 ha). It is adjacent to the city of Twentynine Palms and Joshua Tree National Park.

The Riverside County reservation was shared with the Cabazon Band of Mission Indians prior to 1976, when the reservation was split by Congressional Act. The larger Cabazon Indian Reservation lies adjacent to the main section of the reservation, mostly to the south and southeast, but surrounding it in every direction except its eastern border. The main reservation lies partly in the service area of the Indio post office (zip code 92201) and partly in that of the Coachella post office (zip code 92236), although it is not part of either city.

A Chemehuevi Burial Ground in the city of Twentynine Palms was officially established in 1976 when an acre of land containing fifty to sixty graves, one half mile south of the intersection of Highway 62 and Adobe Road in Twentynine Palms, was conveyed to the Twenty-Nine Palms Park and Recreation District by Congress. In 1909 fifty to sixty marked graves were reported on the site, including the grave of Old Jim Boniface, leader of the tribe, who died in 1903 at the age of ninety. Other marked graves included thirteen of fourteen children of Jim and Matilda Pine, possibly victims of smallpox, and Mrs. Waterman (tribal name: Ticup), who was beaten to death by Willie Boy after she threw his rifle and ammunition into a pond. After the Willie Boy incident, the tribe left Twentynine Palms and went to live with the Mission Creek Reservation. The State of California declared the Chemehuevi Cemetery a Point of Historical Interest in 1974.

== Government and programs ==
The tribe's headquarters is located in Coachella, California, and their current tribal chairman is Darrell Mike.

In 1995, the Twenty-Nine Palms Band established the Spotlight 29 Casino in Coachella. In 2014, the Twenty-Nine Palms Band established the Tortoise Rock Casino in Twentynine Palms.

In 1997, the tribe established the 29 Palms Band of Mission Indians Tribal Environmental Protection Agency, in partnership with the US Environmental Protection Agency. The tribe's EPA manages all environmental protection programs on their reservation, including improving water quality. Joshua Tree National Park announced in December 2022 that a stewardship agreement will involve the tribe in the park's management and development.

== Sources ==
- Eargle, Dolan H., Jr. (1992). California Indian Country: The Land and the People. San Francisco: Tree Company Press. ISBN 0-937401-20-X.
- Pritzker, Barry M. (2000). A Native American Encyclopedia: History, Culture, and Peoples. Oxford: Oxford University Press. ISBN 978-0-19-513877-1.
