= Spotlight 29 Casino =

Indian casino in Coachella, California

Coordinates: 33.7106°N 116.1832°W

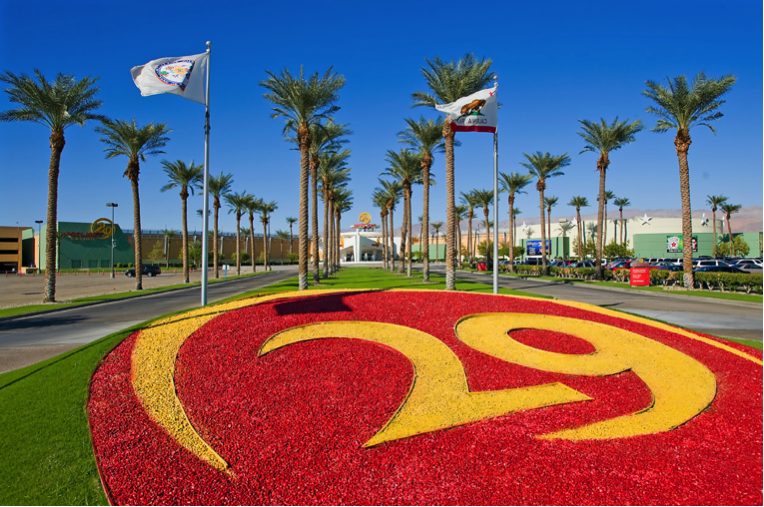
- Entrance to Spotlight 29 Casino
- Interactive map of Spotlight 29 Casino
- Location: Coachella, California; 46-200 Harrison Place, Coachella CA 92236
- Opened: January 14, 1995; 31 years ago
- Signature attractions: Spotlight Showroom, Blue Bar, Hot Spot, Groove
- Notable restaurants: JEM Steakhouse, Cafe Capitata
- Casino type: Indian
- Owner: Twenty-Nine Palms Band of Mission Indians of California
- Website: spotlight29.com

Spotlight 29 Casino is an Indian casino in Coachella, California, United States, owned and operated by the Twenty-Nine Palms Band of Mission Indians of California. The casino is 250,000 square feet, with 1,600 slot machines and 22 table games. Amenities include two restaurants, a coffee shop, four bars, and the Spotlight Showroom, which seats 2,200.

== History ==
Spotlight 29 Casino opened in January 1995 to the public under the right of the National Indian Gaming Regulatory Act of 1988, allowing Native American Tribes to operate casinos. In March 2001, the Twenty-Nine Palms Band of Mission Indians teamed with Donald Trump and Spotlight 29 Casino became Trump 29 Casino, opening on April 2, 2002. In 2006, the relationship with Donald Trump ended, and the casino returned to its original name, after which many renovations were completed including a new 1,200 vehicle parking structure and an expansion of nearly 150,000 square feet, updating the casino to include nearly 250,000 square feet for gaming, offices, meetings and conferences, dining and entertainment.

== Gaming ==
=== Slots ===
Spotlight 29 Casino has 1,600 slot machines, including a high limit slot area and the most penny games in the Coachella Valley. Guests must be 18 or older to gamble on the property.

=== Table Games ===
22 table games including:

- Blackjack
- Spanish 21
- Single Deck Blackjack
- Three Card Poker
- Fortune Pai Gow
- Mini Baccarat
- Mystery Card Roulette
- Ultimate Texas Hold'em

== Entertainment ==
=== Spotlight Showroom ===
The Spotlight Showroom has 2,200 seats for live concerts, entertainment, sporting events, conferences, and special events. The Showroom, in the past, hosted the Twenty-Nine Palms Band of Mission Indian's annual Winter POW WOW as well as Theresa A. Mike Scholarship Foundation's annual Fashion Show.

=== Chairman's Lounge ===
The Chairman's Lounge features comedy shows, UFC and Boxing Event showings, and special events.
