= Coachella, California =

City in the United States

- City
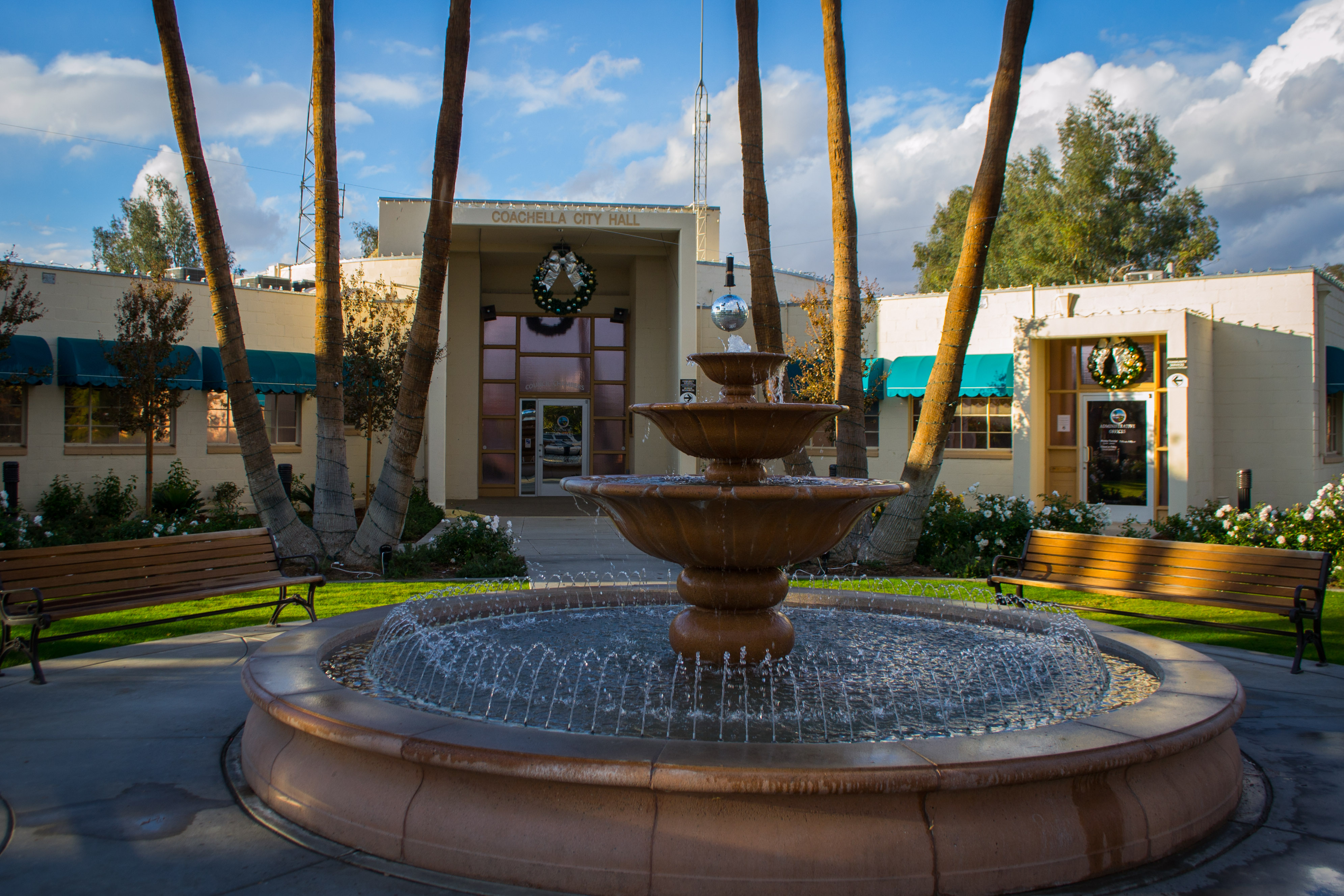
- Coachella City Hall

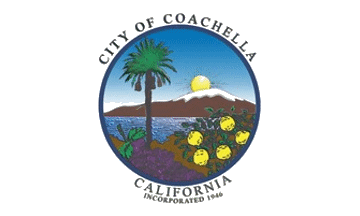
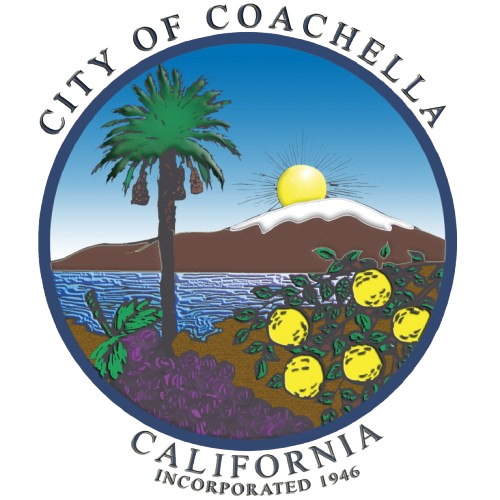
- Flag Seal
- Nicknames: Coachello, La Coachelita and Cochela
- Interactive map of Coachella, California
- Location in the United States
- Coordinates: 33°40′46″N 116°10′28″W
- Country: United States
- State: California
- County: Riverside
- Native American Reservation (partial): Twenty-Nine Palms Band of Mission Indians & Cabazon Band of Mission Indians
- Incorporated: December 13, 1946

Government
  - Type: Council-Manager
  - Mayor: Frank Figueroa
  - Mayor Pro Tem: Yadira Perez
  - City Council: Stephanie Virgen; Denise Delgado; Juan M. Martinez
  - City Manager: Gabriel Martin

Area
  - Total: 30.08 sq mi (77.90 km^{2})
  - Land: 30.08 sq mi (77.90 km^{2})
  - Water: 0 sq mi (0.00 km^{2}) 0%
- Elevation: −69 ft (−21 m)

Population (2020)
  - Total: 41,941
  - Density: 1,394.4/sq mi (538.39/km^{2})

Languages
  - Official: English, Spanish
- Time zone: UTC−8 (PST)
  - Summer (DST): UTC−7 (PDT)
- ZIP code: 92236
- Area codes: 442/760
- FIPS code: 06-14260
- Website: www.coachella.org

Coachella (/ˌkoʊəˈtʃɛlə/ KOH-ə-CHEL-ə, commonly /koʊˈtʃɛlə/ koh-CHEL-ə (Note: Despite originating from the word conchilla (Spanish pronunciation: [kon'tʃiʎa]), the name of Coachella is not pronounced /ˌkoʊəˈtʃeɪjə/ (KOH-ə-CHAY-yə), because it is an American English bastardization of Spanish rather than an actual Spanish name.)) is a city in Riverside County, California, United States. It is the namesake and easternmost city of the Coachella Valley, in Southern California's Colorado Desert. Originally a railroad town, Coachella is a prominent hub for agriculture and shipping across Southern California and the Western United States.

Coachella had a population of 41,941 in the 2020 Census. The city is officially bilingual in English and Spanish, with 90% of people speaking Spanish.

== History ==
=== Founding of the community ===
The city was founded as Woodspur in 1876, when the Southern Pacific Railroad built a rail siding on the site to allow the harvesting of mesquite lumber for use by the railroad and later for shipment to the Los Angeles market. Jason L. Rector, an employee of Southern Pacific, was the first recorded non-Native American resident of Woodspur.

In the 1880s, in the decade after the federal government divided the land the indigenous Cahuilla tribe had historically occupied between the tribe and railroads on a checkerboard pattern, the tribe sold its land plots to the railroads for new lands east of the current town site. In the 1890s, a few hundred traqueros, including a number of immigrant Mexican railroad workers, settled along the tracks.

Coachella was transformed from a 2.5-square-mile (6.5 km^{2}) territory gridded out on the mesquite-covered desert floor to a town in its own right after Rector and his brother dug the first artesian well in 1900, providing fresh water to support incoming settlers and irrigation for agriculture.

In 1901, the citizens of Woodspur voted on a new name for their community at a town hall meeting, settling on "Coachella". The name does not mean anything in Spanish or any of the indigenous languages of the region.

=== Development of Coachella and the eastern Coachella Valley ===
After their first test well proved successful the Rector brothers cleared 25 acres, which they planted in barley, wheat, cantaloupes, watermelons and sugar beets, later that year. As the Los Angeles Times reported at the time, "the land proved wonderfully fertile, and all of the crops did well, coming to maturity in a phenomenally short time."

The Coachella Valley was especially attractive because it was able to produce crops earlier than other regions in the Southwestern United States. By 1902 over 100 artesian wells had been drilled in the Valley as hundreds of farmers arrived there.

By 1902 Rector had organized the Coachella Valley Produce Association, which shipped the first boxcar of fruit ever raised in the valley. A packing house was later built in the town, followed shortly by an ice and pre-cooling plant.

These anglo growers initially relied on local Cahuilla Indians, whose traditional economy and way of life had been destroyed by smallpox, reservations and land allotments, to grow and pack their crops. When these farmers' need for labor outstripped that supply they recruited farmworkers from Japan.

They were followed by large numbers of Mexican immigrants seeking work in the United States as a result of the turmoil produced by the Mexican Revolution beginning in 1910 and the Cristero Rebellion of the 1920s. These immigrants, joined by Mexican-American migrants from elsewhere in the Southwest, worked as farmworkers, cooks, construction workers and ran produce transport companies, markets, restaurants and ranches.

Many of these Mexican immigrants were driven out, either by formal deportation proceedings or informal coercion, during the Great Depression. Later, during World War II, the United States government entered into agreement with the Mexican government to bring back thousands of Mexican farmworkers under the Bracero Program.

Japanese immigrants and their American-born families were also removed from the Coachella Valley when the United States government interned them during World War II. Many of these internees returned to the Coachella Valley, where they received a warmer reception than in other parts of California.

African-Americans also moved to the Coachella Valley during the Great Migration beginning in the 1910s. Smaller numbers of migrants came from places such as Turkey and Portugal.

=== Post-War changes ===
Coachella became a city in 1946. During the incorporation voting process, the first city council was tentatively elected.

In the 1950s Coachella begin to expand its range, about 32 square miles (83 km^{2}), an area which contained large year-round agricultural corporate farms and fruit groves, particularly of citrus (lemons, oranges, grapefruit) and date palms.

The Coachella Valley proved to be a key site in the United Farm Workers's efforts to organize farmworkers. The union reached its first collective bargaining agreement with a table grape grower in 1970, when David Freedman & Co. broke with other grape growers and signed with the UFW. The rest of the industry soon followed suit.

=== Political and economic developments in Coachella ===
By the 1980 census, Coachella's population had reached at least 10,000 due to relatively slow population growth. Due to a high percentage of Hispanics in the city, Coachella was a scene of Chicano political activism.

In 1995, state and federal officials designated Coachella as part of the Coachella Valley Enterprise Zone to boost economic activity and entice businesses to relocate to this rural city which was once home to several fruit shipping plants.

In 2010, a Coca-Cola bottling facility (a LEED certified building) was added to the city's new light industry facilities, a boon in the rapid-growth community which has a currently troubled economy.

== Geography ==
According to the United States Census Bureau, the city has a total area of 30.08 square miles (77.9 km^{2}), all of it land.

The elevation is 68 feet (21 m) below sea level, as the eastern half of the Coachella Valley is below sea level. The saltwater lake, Salton Sea, 10 miles (16 km) south of Coachella, is 228 feet (69 m) below sea level.

=== Climate ===
This climate is dominated in all months by the subtropical anticyclone, or subtropical high, with its descending air, elevated inversions, and clear skies. Although only a short distance from Banning, California which has a warm-summer Mediterranean climate, it also lies in a rainshadow that allows Coachella only about one-fourth the precipitation of Banning. The Köppen Climate Classification subtype for this climate is "Bwh" (Tropical and Subtropical Desert Climate).

Climate data for Coachella, California (1981–2010 normals)
Month	Jan	Feb	Mar	Apr	May	Jun	Jul	Aug	Sep	Oct	Nov	Dec	Year
Record high °F (°C)	95 (35)	99 (37)	104 (40)	112 (44)	116 (47)	121 (49)	123 (51)	123 (51)	121 (49)	116 (47)	102 (39)	93 (34)	123 (51)
Mean daily maximum °F (°C)	70.7 (21.5)	73.9 (23.3)	80.5 (26.9)	87.5 (30.8)	95.6 (35.3)	103.6 (39.8)	108.1 (42.3)	107.3 (41.8)	101.7 (38.7)	91.1 (32.8)	78.4 (25.8)	69.3 (20.7)	89.0 (31.7)
Mean daily minimum °F (°C)	45.5 (7.5)	48.0 (8.9)	52.2 (11.2)	57.4 (14.1)	64.4 (18.0)	71.0 (21.7)	77.6 (25.3)	77.6 (25.3)	71.7 (22.1)	62.5 (16.9)	51.8 (11.0)	44.2 (6.8)	60.3 (15.7)
Record low °F (°C)	19 (−7)	24 (−4)	29 (−2)	34 (1)	36 (2)	44 (7)	54 (12)	52 (11)	46 (8)	30 (−1)	23 (−5)	23 (−5)	19 (−7)
Average precipitation inches (mm)	1.15 (29)	1.11 (28)	0.53 (13)	0.06 (1.5)	0.02 (0.51)	0.02 (0.51)	0.13 (3.3)	0.29 (7.4)	0.23 (5.8)	0.24 (6.1)	0.32 (8.1)	0.87 (22)	4.97 (126)
Average precipitation days (≥ 0.01 in)	3.1	3.2	1.6	0.6	0.2	0	0.6	0.9	0.8	0.7	0.8	1.9	14.4
Source: NOAA

== Demographics ==
Despite its image for Mexican immigration, a large percentage are US citizens, born and raised in Coachella. A multi-generational Mexican American culture has taken root in the town, including a significant portion particularly from the Mexican state of Sinaloa.

Much of the population consists of younger Latino families (an estimated 90 percent of Hispanic origin) and, in the outlying areas, migrant farm workers. The city is officially bilingual in the English and Spanish languages, though city council meetings are held in English. Historically, apart from the Hispanic/Latino and/or Native Americans, other ethnic groups in Coachella included Arabs, Armenians, Filipinos, Italians, Japanese, and recent immigrants from Southeast Asia and the former Yugoslavia.

Historical population
Census	Pop.	Note	%±
1950	2,755		—
1960	4,854		76.2%
1970	8,353		72.1%
1980	9,129		9.3%
1990	16,896		85.1%
2000	22,724		34.5%
2010	40,704		79.1%
2020	41,941		3.0%
U.S. Decennial Census

=== Racial and ethnic composition ===
Coachella city, California – Racial and ethnic composition Note: the US Census treats Hispanic/Latino as an ethnic category. This table excludes Latinos from the racial categories and assigns them to a separate category. Hispanics/Latinos may be of any race.
Race / Ethnicity (NH = Non-Hispanic)	Pop 1980	Pop 1990	Pop 2000	Pop 2010	Pop 2020	% 1980	% 1990	% 2000	% 2010	% 2020
White alone (NH)	849	546	363	933	836	9.30%	3.23%	1.60%	2.29%	1.99%
Black or African American alone (NH)	92	69	61	140	136	1.01%	0.41%	0.27%	0.34%	0.32%
Native American or Alaska Native alone (NH)	18	45	53	54	83	0.20%	0.27%	0.23%	0.13%	0.20%
Asian alone (NH)	6	76	35	168	143	0.07%	0.45%	0.15%	0.41%	0.34%
Native Hawaiian or Pacific Islander alone (NH)	6	76	1	13	10	0.07%	0.45%	-	0.03%	0.02%
Other race alone (NH)	16	53	31	29	163	0.18%	0.31%	0.14%	0.07%	0.39%
Mixed race or Multiracial (NH)	x	x	48	113	149	x	x	0.21%	0.28%	0.36%
Hispanic or Latino (any race)	8,148	16,107	22,132	39,254	40,421	89.25%	95.33%	97.39%	96.44%	96.38%
Total	9,129	16,896	22,724	40,704	41,941	100.00%	100.00%	100.00%	100.00%	100.00%

=== 2020 census ===
As of the 2020 census, Coachella had a population of 41,941. The population density was 1,394.5 inhabitants per square mile (538.4/km^{2}). The racial makeup of Coachella was 17.3% White, 0.5% African American, 2.1% Native American, 0.6% Asian, 0.0% Pacific Islander, 55.7% from other races, and 23.7% from two or more races. Hispanic or Latino residents numbered 40,421 (96.4% of the population).

The census reported that 99.9% of the population lived in households, 0.1% lived in non-institutionalized group quarters, and no one was institutionalized. Of residents, 98.9% lived in urban areas and 1.1% lived in rural areas.

There were 9,797 households, out of which 62.9% included children under the age of 18, 57.5% were married-couple households, 7.6% were cohabiting couple households, 23.5% had a female householder with no partner present, and 11.5% had a male householder with no partner present. 5.8% of households were one person, and 2.3% were one person aged 65 or older. The average household size was 4.27. There were 8,861 families (90.4% of all households).

The age distribution was 32.3% under the age of 18, 12.1% aged 18 to 24, 28.7% aged 25 to 44, 19.6% aged 45 to 64, and 7.3% who were 65 years of age or older. The median age was 28.6 years. For every 100 females, there were 98.8 males, and for every 100 females age 18 and over there were 95.2 males.

There were 10,069 housing units at an average density of 334.8 units per square mile (129.3 units/km^{2}), of which 9,797 (97.3%) were occupied. Of these, 62.3% were owner-occupied, and 37.7% were occupied by renters. The homeowner vacancy rate was 0.6%, the rental vacancy rate was 1.7%, and 2.7% of housing units were vacant.

=== 2023 ACS estimates ===
In 2023, the US Census Bureau estimated that the median household income was $67,558, and the per capita income was $24,922. About 11.1% of families and 10.6% of the population were below the poverty line.

=== 2010 census ===
The 2010 United States census reported that Coachella had a population of 40,704. The population density was 1,406.0 people per square mile (542.9 per km^{2}). The racial makeup of Coachella was 19,576 (48.1%) White (2.3% Non-Hispanic White), 320 (0.8%) African American, 290 (0.7%) Native American, 266 (0.7%) Asian, 34 (0.1%) Pacific Islander, 19,154 (47.1%) from other races, and 1,064 (2.6%) from two or more races. Hispanic or Latino of any race were 39,254 persons (96.4%).

The Census reported that 40,646 people (99.9% of the population) lived in households, 58 (0.1%) lived in non-institutionalized group quarters, and 0 (0%) were institutionalized.

There were 8,998 households, out of which 6,625 (73.6%) had children under the age of 18 living in them, 5,583 (62.0%) were opposite-sex married couples living together, 1,927 (21.4%) had a female householder with no husband present, 820 (9.1%) had a male householder with no wife present. There were 795 (8.8%) unmarried opposite-sex partnerships, and 76 (0.8%) same-sex married couples or partnerships. 464 households (5.2%) were made up of individuals, and 151 (1.7%) had someone living alone who was 65 years of age or older. The average household size was 4.52. There were 8,330 families (92.6% of all households); the average family size was 4.57.

The population was spread out, with 15,786 people (38.8%) under the age of 18, 4,889 people (12.0%) aged 18 to 24, 11,896 people (29.2%) aged 25 to 44, 6,306 people (15.5%) aged 45 to 64, and 1,827 people (4.5%) who were 65 years of age or older. The median age was 24.5 years. For every 100 females, there were 99.3 males. For every 100 females age 18 and over, there were 97.3 males.

There were 9,903 housing units at an average density of 342.1 per square mile (132.1 per km^{2}), of which 5,586 (62.1%) were owner-occupied, and 3,412 (37.9%) were occupied by renters. The homeowner vacancy rate was 6.4%; the rental vacancy rate was 5.4%. 25,519 people (62.7% of the population) lived in owner-occupied housing units and 15,127 people (37.2%) lived in rental housing units.

According to the 2010 United States Census, Coachella had a median household income of $41,611, with 27.9% of the population living below the federal poverty line.

== Economy ==
=== Top employers ===
According to the city's 2020 Comprehensive Annual Financial Report, the largest employers are:

#	Employer	Employees
1	Coachella Valley Unified School District	530
2	Spotlight 29 Casino	496
3	Ernie Ball	380
4	Augustine Casino	314
5	Armtec Defense	236
6	Valley Pride	200
7	Coachella Valley Water District	194
8	Teserra Outdoors	156
9	Cardenas Market	118
10	Reyes Coca-Cola Bottling	103

Near the city limits of Coachella are three casinos on Indian reservations: Fantasy Springs Resort and Casino, Spotlight 29 Casino, and Augustine Casino, which are owned and operated by Native American tribes – the Cabazon Band of Mission Indians, Twentynine Palms Band of Mission Indians, and Augustine Band of Cahuilla Indians, respectively. These small but highly profitable tribes have representative councils to ensure self-reliance as a community. Coachella is also home to a significant Southwest Indian (Apache, Hopi, Navajo and Zuni) population, though not indigenous to the California desert region.

== Housing and recreation ==
Since 2000, thousands of single-family homes and multi-unit apartment complexes have been built at a fast pace, as the city's population soared, having more than doubled in just a decade.

In 2015, the number of unpermitted trailer parks, often housing farmworkers, was estimated at "dozens if not more than 100." Many of these parks are in poor condition. Some have dirt roads and frequent power outages, or drinking water supplies contaminated with arsenic or hexavalent chromium. It is uncertain whether it would be more practical to bring in city water and sewer lines, or to simply start over with new developments. Given that a recent 181-unit development, Mountain View Estates, required over 28 million dollars in funding, the nonprofit Pueblo Unido Community Development Corp. is pushing for code upgrades of existing facilities. A court case which alleged that the county had made an intentional effort to close trailer parks with Latino populations was settled in 2000. The US$21 million from the settlement was used to build three farmworker housing projects. As of 2015, dirt roads in 35 trailer parks are being paved as part of a US$3.4 million county project.

Coachella expanded recreational and social activities for which residents once had to drive 10 or 20 miles (16 or 32 km) west. The city has a recreation center, a Boys and Girls Club center, and a boxing club in Bagdouma Park. There are two dance clubs and the Corona Yacht Club located near Spotlight 29 casino; two new golf courses (Desert Lakes and the Vineyards) attract many retirees, RV owners, and local business people.

== Events and points of interest ==
Three popular fiestas are celebrated each year in town: Cinco de Mayo (May 5), the 16 de Septiembre Fiestas Patrias (Mexico's Independence from Spain) and the 12 de Diciembre (the patron saint of Mexico, Santa Maria de Guadalupe) to celebrate the Virgin Mary.

- Coachella Valley Music and Arts Festival
- Coachella Valley Radio Control Club
- Shady Lane Mural
- The film director Frank Capra is interred in the Coachella Valley Cemetery.

== Sports ==
The Coachella Football Club is a semi-professional American soccer team based in Coachella. Founded in January 2024, the team plays in USL League Two, the fourth tier of the American Soccer Pyramid.

== Government and politics ==
United States presidential election results for Coachella, California
Year	Republican		Democratic		Third party(ies)	
Year	No.	%	No.	%	No.	%
2000	331	13.38%	2,084	84.27%	58	2.35%
2004	804	24.78%	2,409	74.24%	32	0.99%
2008	733	14.75%	4,179	84.07%	59	1.19%
2012	618	10.73%	5,072	88.07%	69	1.20%
2016	745	9.84%	6,450	85.22%	374	4.94%
2020	2,008	19.73%	7,948	78.11%	220	2.16%
2024	3,219	35.21%	5,673	62.05%	250	2.73%

In the California State Legislature, Coachella is in the 18th senatorial district, represented by Democrat Steve Padilla, and in the 36th Assembly district, represented by Republican Jeff Gonzalez.

In the United States House of Representatives, Coachella is in California's 25th congressional district, represented by Democrat Raul Ruiz.

== Education ==
Coachella is served by the Coachella Valley Unified School District, based in Thermal, California. Its main high school is Coachella Valley High School (with 2900 students) followed by a new high school, Desert Mirage High School, about 5 miles to the south; its three middle schools are Cahuilla Desert Academy, Toro Canyon, and Bobby Duke. Elementary schools include Cesar Chavez, Coral Mountain Academy, Palm View, Peter Pendleton, Valle Del Sol, Valley View, Westside and in nearby Thermal, John Kelley.

The Coachella Valley Adult School, in operation since 1952, is the third-largest adult school in Riverside County. It offers seven levels of English as a Second Language (ESL), and has offered citizenship classes for over 20 years. In the last ten years, over 1,500 people completed citizenship classes at the school and submitted N-400 forms.

== Public safety ==
The Riverside County Sheriff's Department provides law enforcement for the city from the nearby Thermal Regional Station. The original Coachella Police Department was absorbed by the Sheriff's Department in 1998.

The city of Coachella contracts for fire and paramedic services with the Riverside County Fire Department through a cooperative agreement with CAL FIRE.

American Medical Response provides ambulance services to Coachella

== Transportation ==
Near Coachella, a new four-lane expressway, State Route 86, was built for international trucking from Mexicali, Mexico to Los Angeles or Arizona. Referred to as the "NAFTA highway" (in reference to the North American Free Trade Agreement took effect in 1994), it replaces an older and less safe two-lane road known as the "killer highway, deadly highway, and death highway" where over 400 auto accident fatalities took place since 1980.

A plan is being developed for new passenger rail service that would span approximately 144 miles from Los Angeles Union Station (LAUS) to Coachella. Construction would take an estimated ten years following completion of an Environmental Impact Statement/Environmental Impact Report (EIS/EIR).

== In popular culture ==
In 2001 Huell Howser Productions, in association with KCET/Los Angeles, featured Coachella in California's Gold; the program is available as a VHS videorecording.

== Notable people ==
- Harold D. McNaughton (1926–1996) – land developer whose master-planned proposal became the foundation for La Entrada.
- Raul Ruiz (born 1972) – U.S. representative for California
