= Buddy box =

Buddy box or buddy boxing is a colloquialism referring to two R/C aircraft radio systems joined together for pilot training purposes.

This training system is universal among the six major R/C radio manufacturers (Spektrum, Futaba, JR, Hitec, Sanwa/Airtronics and KO Propo) which means that transmitters do not have to be the same brand in order to be joined via an umbilical cable. There are, however, two different types of DIN cable connectors used for the purpose and the two are incompatible. Therefore, both transmitters must have the same type of receptacle in order to operate together.

Buddy boxing is accomplished by joining the student and master transmitters via the aforementioned cable and making sure that the servo reversing switches and trims are set identical on both. The student is given control of the aircraft via a long-handled, spring-loaded switch on the top left corner of most transmitters located on the master transmitter, normally held by the instructor. When the switch is pulled forward and held on by the instructor's left index finger, control of the aircraft is at the student's transmitter. Should the instructor judge that the student is encountering difficulty in flight, control is transferred to the master transmitter merely by releasing the switch. (On some older Futaba radios such as the popular 6XA, the trainer switch is actually a push-button located in the corner, the aforementioned corner toggle switch is reserved for channel 5 - landing gear.)

The two transmitters need not be on the same frequency. The master transmitter is the one that actually flies the plane; buddy boxing turns the student transmitter into a "dummy" remote control of the master. The student transmitter is operated with power switched off as power for both is provided by the master. The student transmitter will power up via the umbilical despite being switched off.
