= Rachel Binah =

American politician

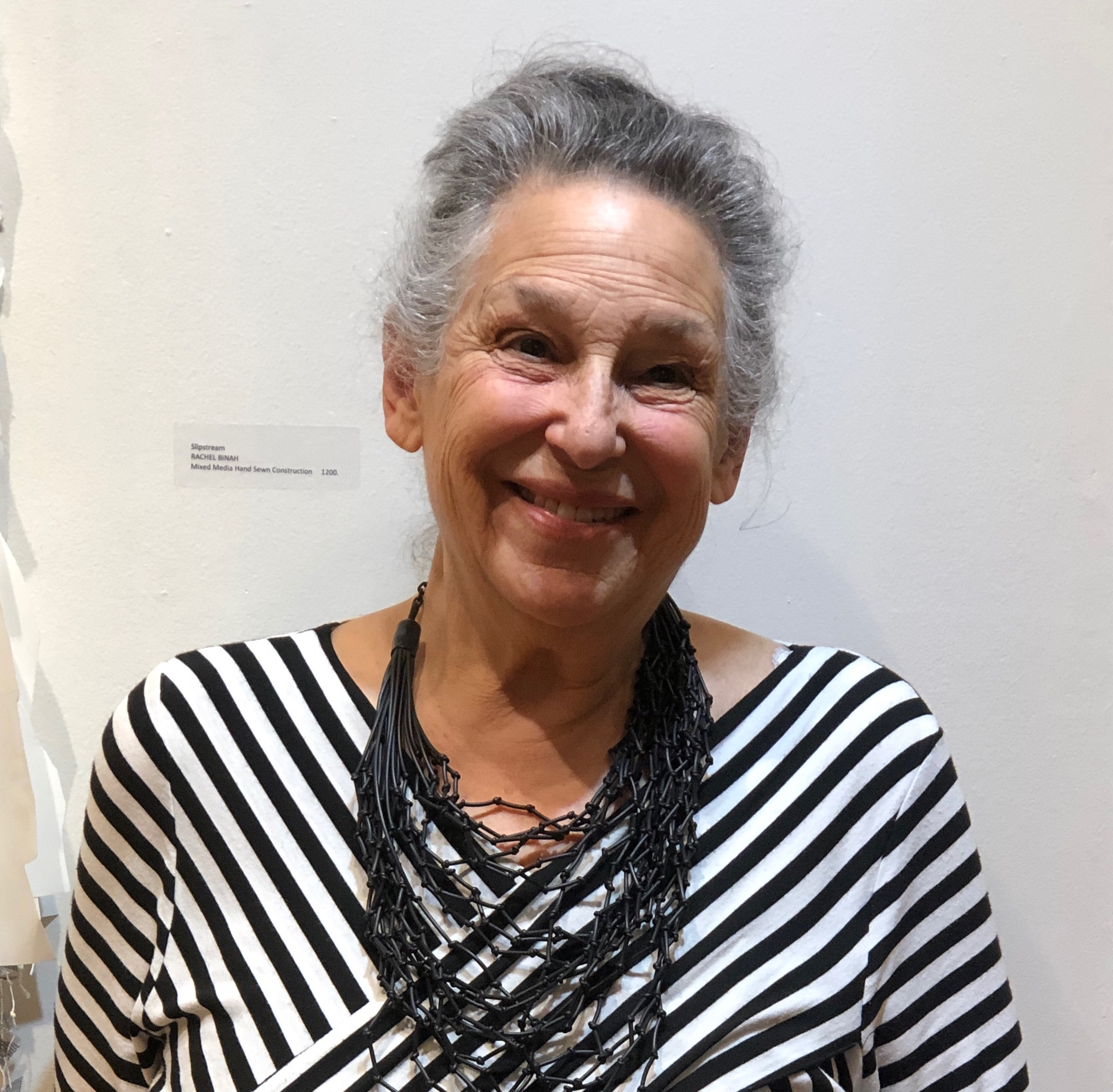
- Rachel Binah at an art exhibition in Fort Bragg in 2019.
- Born: 1942 (age 83–84); Brooklyn, New York United States
- Occupations: Activist; Artist

Rachel Binah (born 1942) is an American artist and environmental and community activist. Binah was one of many in the Mendocino coastal communities who helped to organize the final hearing, in 1988, of "Lease Sale 91" by the Minerals Management Service of the Department of the Interior (in Fort Bragg, California) to protest against offshore oil development off the North Coast of California. Upwards of 2,500 people (it is thought that as many as 5,000) attended the federal hearing, with 1400 volunteering to testify. Binah has also served as chair emeritus of the California Democratic Party's Environmental Caucus and the Democratic National Committee committeewoman. Aside from environmental concerns, Binah is also interested in health care, spearheaded by her father suffering from Alzheimer's disease. She also owned a bed and breakfast in Little River, California. In 2009, Binah was a National Women's History Month honoree.

== Exhibitions ==
Rachel Binah: "Black and White in Color, Paper and Constructions." The exhibition was presented in Partners Gallery in Mendocino, California on July 5, 2018 – July 31, 2018. Binah's intention for this exhibition was to explore the current sentiment of modern politics.
