= List of cemeteries in San Bernardino County, California =

This list of cemeteries in San Bernardino County, California includes currently operating, historical (closed for new interments), and defunct (graves abandoned or removed) cemeteries, columbaria, and mausolea in San Bernardino County, California. It does not include pet cemeteries. Selected interments are given for notable people.

Cemetery	City	Coordinates	Notable interments	References and notes (U.S. Geological Survey GNIS)
Agua Mansa Pioneer Cemetery	Colton	34.0420°N 117.3639°W	Early settlers Louis Rubidoux and Cornelius Jensen	Agua Mansa Cemetery
Bellevue Cemetery, a.k.a. Bellevue Memorial Park	Ontario	34.0717°N 117.3637°W	Frank F. Ross, recipient of the Medal of Honor during the Spanish–American War. Founder of Ontario George Chaffey; early Sierra Club President Aurelia Harwood	Bellview Cemetery; Bellevue Memorial Park: History
Calico Cemetery	County	34.9449°N 116.8673°W		
Campo Santo Cemetery	San Bernardino	34.1400°N 117.2920°W		Campo Santo Cemetery
Daggett Cemetery	Daggett	34.8586°N 116.8800°W		Daggett Cemetery
Desert View Memorial Park	Hesperia	34.4606°N 117.3556°W		Desert View Memorial Park
Fort Mojave Burial Grounds	Needles	34.8517°N 114.6186°W		Fort Mojave Burial Grounds
Gold Mountain Memorial Park	Big Bear City	34.2514°N 116.8242°W		
Green Acres Memorial Gardens	Bloomington	34.0408°N 117.3864°W	John "Chief" Meyers, Major & Minor League baseball player (1908–20)	Green Acres Memorial Gardens
Hermosa Cemetery, a.k.a. Hermosa Gardens Cemetery	Colton	34.0761°N 117.3462°W	Western lawman Morgan Earp; MLB players Cam Carreon and Gordon Maltzberger	Hermosa Cemetery
Hillside Memorial Park Cemetery	Redlands	34.0250°N 117.1798°W	Author Charles Nordhoff; actress Gloria Holden; television journalist Robert Pierpoint	Hillside Cemetery; City of Redlands: Hillside Memorial Park Cemetery
Holly Cemetery	Vidal	34.1220°N 114.5066°W		Holly Cemetery
Home of Eternity Cemetery	San Bernardino	34.1139°N 117.2848°W		Home of Eternity Cemetery
Indian Cemetery	Highland	34.1492°N 117.2220°W		Indian Cemetery
Kramer Cemetery	Kramer	34.9955°N 117.5817°W		Kramer Cemetery
Montecito Memorial Park	Colton	34.0467°N 117.2775°W	MLB players Dee Fondy, Freddie Fitzsimmons and Ken Hubbs; actors Lillian Miles and Roy D'Arcy; Congressman Jerry Pettis	Montecito Memorial Park
Mountain Valley Memorial Park Cemetery, a.k.a. Joshua Tree Memorial Park	Joshua Tree	34.1342°N 116.3508°W		Mountain Valley Memorial Park Cemetery
Mountain View Memorial Park, a.k.a. Mt. View Cemetery	Barstow	34.9230°N 117.0239°W	MLB pitcher Bob Rhoads	Mount View Cemetery
Mountain View Cemetery	San Bernardino	34.1392°N 117.2759°W	James Earp, a member of the Earp family; heavy metal guitarist Randy Rhoads	Mountain View Cemetery
Our Lady Queen of Peace Catholic Cemetery	Loma Linda	34.0503°N 117.2848°W		
Patton State Hospital	Highland	34.1381°N 117.2145°W		
Pioneer Memorial Cemetery	San Bernardino	34.1133°N 117.2839°W	Ellis Eames, first mayor of Provo, Utah	Pioneer Memorial Cemetery;
Rialto Park Cemetery	Rialto	34.1022°N 117.3759°W		
Riverview Cemetery	Needles	34.8233°N 114.5986°W		Riverview Cemetery
Rodigues Cemetery	Victorville	34.6003°N 117.3306°W		Rodigues Cemetery
Silver Lake Cemetery	Baker	35.3765940, -116.1117550		
Searles Valley Cemetery	Trona	35.7738°N 117.38175°W		
Sunset Hills Memorial Park	Apple Valley	34.5576°N 117.1427°W	Dale Evans and Roy Rogers	
Twentynine Palms Cemetery	Twentynine Palms	34.1542°N 116.0994°W		Twentynine Palms Cemetery
United Islamic Youth Cemetery	Adelanto	34.6569°N 117.3884°W		United Islamic Youth Cemetery;
Veterans Memorial Park	Fontana	34.0914°N 117.4287°W		Veterans Memorial Park
Victor Valley Memorial Park	Victor Valley	34.5311°N 117.2895°W	Golfer Lloyd Mangrum; actor Ned Sparks; Nolie Murray (founder of Murray's Dude Ranch)	Victor Valley Memorial Park
Wilbur Grave	Holcomb Valley	34.3058°N 116.9003°W		Wilbur Grave

== See also ==
- List of cemeteries in California
- List of cemeteries in Riverside County, California
