= William David Powell =

American television writer and producer (1925–1968)

- Born: February 27, 1925; California, U.S.
- Died: March 13, 1968 (aged 43); California, U.S.
- Occupations: Television writer, producer
- Spouse(s): Patricia Parsons (m. 1956; div. 1957)
- Parent(s): William Powell; Eileen Wilson

William David Powell (February 27, 1925 – March 13, 1968) was an American television writer and associate producer.

== Biography ==
Powell was the only child of actor William Powell and actress Eileen Wilson, who divorced in 1930. He graduated from Princeton, magna cum laude in English.

On Saturday, December 22, 1956, at age 31, Powell wed former child actress Patricia Parsons (1931–2006), exchanging their wedding vows at the home of his father, on Vereda Norte in Palm Springs, California. The wedding ceremony was performed by Judge Eugene Therieau, with his father as best man and Parsons' sister Mrs. Kenneth Zook as matron of honor. The couple honeymooned in Las Vegas, Nevada. They divorced on September 19, 1957.

Powell went on to become a television writer, whose credits include episodes of Bonanza, Death Valley, 77 Sunset Strip and Rawhide. He also worked as a story editor and coordinator, later an associate producer at Warner Bros. and Universal Studios, and held an executive position at NBC.

In 1968, after suffering from depression, hepatitis and kidney problems that had forced him to quit writing, he died by suicide by stabbing himself repeatedly in the upper body while in the shower. He left a four-page note addressed to his father, to whom he was still very close. The last two sentences were revealed to the public: "Things aren't so good here. I'm going where it's better."

Powell was buried at Cathedral City's Desert Memorial Park in Riverside County, California, where his father and his father's last wife, Diana Lewis, are also buried.
