= Diana Lewis =

American actress (1919–1997)

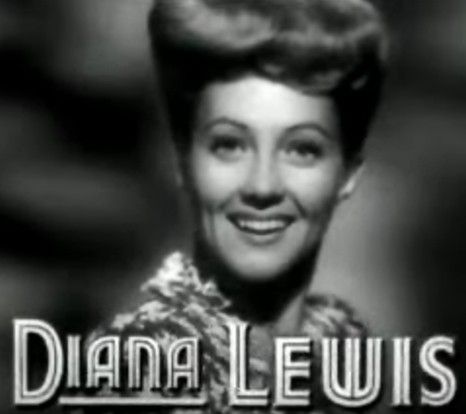
- Trailer for Cry 'Havoc' (1943)
- Born: September 18, 1919; Asbury Park, New Jersey, U.S.
- Died: January 18, 1997 (aged 77); Rancho Mirage, California, U.S.
- Resting place: Desert Memorial Park, Cathedral City, California
- Other names: Mousie Powell
- Occupation: Actress
- Years active: 1934–1943
- Spouses: Jay Raye (m. 1935; div. 1939) William Powell (m. 1940; died 1984)

Diana Lewis (September 18, 1919 – January 18, 1997) was an American film actress and a Metro-Goldwyn-Mayer contract player.

== Early years ==
The daughter of vaudeville performers, Lewis was born in Asbury Park, New Jersey. She attended Fairfax High School in Los Angeles.

== Career ==
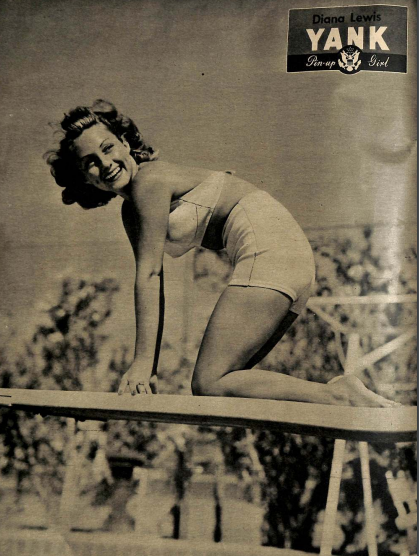
Pin-up photo of Lewis for Yank, the Army Weekly in 1944

Lewis was a singer with the orchestra led by Larry Leeds.

She began her film career in It's a Gift (1934) and worked steadily over the next few years, usually in minor roles. Her more notable films include It's a Gift, Gold Diggers in Paris (1938), Go West (1940), and Johnny Eager (1941). She was the love interest of Andy Hardy as Daphne Fowler in Andy Hardy Meets Debutante (1940).

== Marriage ==
Lewis met actor William Powell, who was 27 years her senior, at MGM in 1939. They married at a dude ranch in Nevada on January 5, 1940, after a courtship of less than a month. She retired from acting in 1943. Lewis became known as Mousie Powell after her marriage.

== Death ==
Lewis died from pancreatic cancer in Rancho Mirage, California, aged 77. She was interred at Cathedral City's Desert Memorial Park in Riverside County, California, alongside Powell, and her stepson, William David Powell.

== Affiliations and honors ==
Lewis was an active supporter of women's golf and the LPGA. The LPGA's William and Mousie Powell Award is named in honor of the Powells.

In 2000, a Golden Palm Star on the Palm Springs, California, Walk of Stars was dedicated to her.

== Complete filmography ==
| Year | Film | Role | Director | Notes |
|---|---|---|---|---|
| 1934 | It's a Gift | Betty Dunk | Norman Z. McLeod | |
| 1935 | One Hour Late | Sick Woman's Daughter | Ralph Murphy | Uncredited |
| 1935 | Enter Madame | Operator | Elliott Nugent | |
| 1935 | All the King's Horses | Aggressive Chorine on Train | Frank Tuttle | Uncredited |
| 1935 | Choose Your Partners | | | Short |
| 1936 | Grand Slam Opera | The Girl Downstairs | Charles Lamont | Short |
| 1937 | Love Nest on Wheels | The Bride | Charles Lamont | Short |
| 1938 | He Couldn't Say No | Iris Mabby | Lewis Seiler | |
| 1938 | Gold Diggers in Paris | Golddigger | Busby Berkeley | |
| 1939 | First Offenders | Ann Blakeley | | |
| 1940 | Forty Little Mothers | Marcia | Busby Berkeley | |
| 1940 | Andy Hardy Meets Debutante | Daphne Fowler | George B. Seitz | |
| 1940 | Bitter Sweet | Jane | | |
| 1940 | Go West | Eve Wilson | Edward Buzzell | |
| 1941 | The People vs. Dr. Kildare | Fay Lennox | Harold S. Bucquet | |
| 1941 | Johnny Eager | Judy Sanford | Mervyn LeRoy | |
| 1942 | Whistling in Dixie | Ellamae Downs | S. Sylvan Simon | |
| 1942 | Seven Sweethearts | Mrs. Nugent | Frank Borzage | |
| 1943 | Cry 'Havoc' | Nydia | Richard Thorpe | |
