= Louis Galen =

American philanthropist

Louis Joseph Galen
- Born: April 19, 1925
- Died: November 12, 2007 (aged 82); Rancho Mirage, California, US
- Occupations: philanthropist banker & CEO of Golden West Financial Corporation
- Spouse: Helene
- Children: 5

Louis "Lou" Joseph Galen (April 19, 1925 – November 12, 2007) was an American philanthropist. Before he retired he was a successful banker and CEO of Golden West Financial Corporation.

== Early life ==
Galen moved to Los Angeles at age 6 with his mother, Faye Roberts, from Youngstown, Ohio, after his father committed suicide. He grew up in West Los Angeles, graduating from Fairfax High School.

== Business career ==
After the war, Galen used $5,000 in military pay to help found Lynwood Savings and Loan in 1946 with his mother, Faye Roberts, and various family members (his $5,000 investment bought him 10% of the S & L's stock). At the same time he attended the University of Southern California Law School on the GI Bill, graduating with an LL.B. in 1951. He practiced law briefly, before focusing on a career in business, initially getting involved in homebuilding as well as the savings and loan industry. In 1959 his mother and Louis formed Trans World Financial Corporation as a holding company for World Savings, and he and his mother subsequently took Trans World public. By 1960, while his mother remained chairman of the board, he became president of Lynwood Savings and Loan, which changed its name to World Savings, then upon his mother's death in 1962 Louis became Chairman of Trans World. Trans World (World Savings) merged with Golden West Financial (Golden West Savings and Loan) of Oakland, California in 1975. The merged savings and loan grew into a multi-state institution. Galen retired on September 6, 2005, at age 80. A year after his retirement, Golden West Financial was acquired by Wachovia for $25 billion. In addition, Galen was separately the chairman of Transworld Bank, a commercial bank in the San Fernando Valley; it was sold to Glendale Federal in 1997.

Galen followed a conservative approach to business, which provided protection from the boom-and-bust cycles that victimized many of his competitors. His corporate board at one time included Alan Greenspan, an economist who would go on to be Chairman of the Federal Reserve.

== USC and philanthropy ==
Galen was a longtime fan of the USC Trojans, buying his first football season tickets in 1947. He never played sports for USC, but had been a fan since boyhood, when he worked at the Coliseum as a hot dog vendor at Trojan football games. He proposed to his wife in front of 3,000 people at a USC/Notre Dame football rally and had the wedding band perform Fight On at his wedding. He presented her a Spirit of Troy marching band helmet on their wedding day; it was his second marriage. Galen's marriage to his first wife, the former Dena Wallerstein, with whom he had three children, ended in divorce.

In 1997, Galen suffered complications after heart surgery to replace a valve and was in a coma for 42 days; after he recovered he decided that he wanted to give away most of his money. Later that year, Galen and his wife donated $1.25 million to USC to establish a student-athlete dining and social activity hall. In 2000 he donated an additional $300,000 for a ceramics studio in the USC School of Fine Arts; he also endowed the Helene V. Galen Intermedia Lab. Galen endowed the Helene and Lou Galen Professorship of Neurology, housed within Keck Medical Center of USC's department of neurology.

Galen's most notable donations were to build USC's on-campus basketball and volleyball arena: the 10,258 seat Galen Center, which opened on October 12, 2006. USC had planned to build a substantial on-campus basketball arena for over 100 years. As a student, Galen attended USC Men's Basketball games in the Shrine Auditorium and Pan-Pacific Auditorium and felt that the team required a better facility. After USC football quarterback Carson Palmer won the 2002 Heisman Trophy, Galen donated $10 million to move the development process forward. On August 28, 2003, Galen donated an additional $25 million to the project to have the building named after himself and his wife. The Galens upped their donation an additional $15 million to make sure that a connected practice facility would also bear their name, bringing the total donation to $50 million.

In addition to USC, the Galens also contributed to the Palm Springs Art Museum, Eisenhower Medical Center, the Barbara Sinatra Children's Center, the McCallum Theatre, the Jewish Federation of Los Angeles, the Anti-Defamation League, Hebrew University and Cedars Sinai Medical Center.

== Personal life ==
Galen was married for over thirty years to his wife Helene and had a family that includes five children and 11 grandchildren. He died on November 12, 2007, at his home in Rancho Mirage after a brief illness; he was 82. He is buried in the Desert Memorial Park in Cathedral City, California. In 2015 Helene was honored with a Golden Palm Star on the Palm Springs Walk of Stars.
