= List of cemeteries in Riverside County, California =

This list of cemeteries in Riverside County, California includes currently operating, historical (closed for new interments), and defunct (graves abandoned or removed) cemeteries, columbaria, and mausolea in Riverside County, California. It does not include pet cemeteries. Selected interments are given for notable people.

Cemetery	City	Coordinates	Notable interments	References and Notes (U.S. Geological Survey GNIS)
Bergman Family Cemetery	Aguanga	33.44831°N 116.89128°W		Bergman Family Cemetery
Cahuilla Indian Cemetery	Anza	33.5393°N 116.7453°W		Cahuilla Indian Cemetery
Coachella Valley Public Cemetery	Coachella Valley	33.6689°N 116.2183°W	Frank Bogert, Frank Capra, Jacqueline Cochran, "Desert Steve" Ragsdale, Tommy Shepard, John Van Druten	Coachella Valley Cemetery
Corona Sunnyslope Cemetery	Corona	33.8692°N 117.5464°W	USC Trojans Athletic Director Jess Hill	Corona Sunnyslope Cemetery; Sunny Shope Cemetery
Crestlawn Memorial Park	Riverside	33.9527°N 117.5197°W	Medal of Honor recipient George Alan Ingalls. MLB player Mike Darr; Actors Darwood Kaye and Roland Harrah III	Crestlawn Memorial Park; Pierce Brothers: Crestlawn Memorial Park
Desert Lawn Funeral Home and Memorial Park	Calimesa	33.9567°N 117.0211°W		Forest Lawn Memorial Gardens (Variant Name)
Desert Memorial Park	Cathedral City	33.8183°N 116.4417°W	See: Desert Memorial Park: Notable interments	Palm Springs District Cemetery; Palm Springs Cemetery District
Elsinore Valley Cemetery; Includes the Jewish Home of Peace Cemetery, a.k.a. Mt. Sinai Memorial Park	Lake Elsinore	33.6941°N 117.3428°W		Elsinore Valley Cemetery; Elsinore Valley Cemetery District
Evergreen Cemetery	Riverside	33.9799°N 117.3869°W	Medal of Honor recipient Cornelius C. Smith. See also: Evergreen Cemetery: Notable interments	Evergreen Memorial Historic Cemetery
Forest Lawn Cemetery – Cathedral City	Cathedral City	33.8154°N 116.4413°W	See: Forest Lawn Cemetery: Notable interments	Forest Lawn: Cathedral City
Hope Lutheran Church Columbarium	Palm Desert	33.7155°N 116.3726°W		Hope Lutheran Church Columbarium; Hope Lutheran Church
Jane Augustine Patencio Cemetery	Palm Springs	33.8222°N 116.5341°W	Artist Carl Eytel	Jane Augustine Patencio Cemetery; Palm Springs
Laurel Cemetery	Murrieta	33.5422°N 117.2220°W	Actor Douglas Fowley	Murrieta Valley Cemetery District; Laurel Cemetery
Louis Wolf Tombstone	Temecula	33.4640°N 117.1200°W		Louis Wolf Tombstone; Maintained by the Temecula Valley Historical Society.
Manker Family Cemetery	Lake Elsinore	33.6689°N 117.2452°W		Manker Family Cemetery; Managed by the Lake Elsinore Genealogical Society.
Martinez Cemetery	Thermal	33.5603°N 116.1525°W		Martinez Cemetery
McCanna Family Cemetery	Perris	33.7802°N 117.2158°W		Abandoned/Lost.
Moravian Cemetery	Morongo Reservation	33.9541°N 116.8199°W		Moravian Cemetery; Banning Library District
Mountain View Cemetery	Beaumont	33.9438°N 116.9809°W		Mount View Cemetery; Summit Cemetery District: Mountain View Cemetery
Olivewood Memorial Park	Riverside	33.9533°N 117.3803°W	Medal of Honor recipients Jesus S. Duran and Ysmael R. Villegas. Travis Alexander, Dorothy Burgess, Ben H. Lewis, Del Lord, Gloria Ramirez, Eric Show	Olivewood Cemetery; Olivewood Memorial Park
Palo Verde Cemetery	Blythe	33.6308°N 114.6007°W		Palo Verde Cemetery
Perris Valley Cemetery	Perris	33.7945°N 117.2256°W		Perris Valley Cemetery
Radec Cemetery	Radec	33.4649°N 116.9134°W		Radec Cemetery; Maintained by the County of Riverside.
Riverside National Cemetery	Riverside	33.8846°N 117.2760°W	Medal of Honor recipients John H. Balch, Walter D. Ehlers, Lewis Millett, Mitchell Paige, and Ysmael R. Villegas. See also: Riverside National Cemetery: Notable interments	Riverside National Cemetery; Veterans Department: Riverside National Cemetery
Ryan Ranch Cemetery	Joshua Tree National Park	33.9836°N 116.1499°W		Ryan Ranch Cemetery
Saint Boniface Indian School Cemetery	Banning	33.9393°N 116.8888°W		Saint Boniface Indian School Cemetery
Saint Mary's Catholic Cemetery	Morongo Indian Reservation	33.9612°N 116.8244°W	Indian culture scholar Katherine Siva Saubel	Saint Mary's Catholic Cemetery; Saint Kateri Tekakwitha Catholic Community: St. Mary's Mission; Banning Library District
San Gorgonio Memorial Park	Banning	33.9494°N 116.8822°W	Medal of Honor recipient William Powers Morris	San Gorgonio Memorial Park; Summit Cemetery District: San Gorgonio Memorial Park
San Jacinto Valley Cemetery	San Jacinto	33.7603°N 116.9613°W	Danish cartoonist Henning Dahl Mikkelsen	San Jacinto Valley Cemetery; San Jacinto Valley Cemetery District
Sherman Indian School Cemetery	Home Gardens	33.8789°N 117.5040°W		Sherman Indian School Cemetery; Sherman Indian Museum: Cemetery
St. Margaret's Episcopal Church Columbarium	Palm Desert	33.7032°N 116.3980°W		Saint Margaret's Episcopal Church Columbarium http://www.stmargarets.org/ St. Margaret's Episcopal Church] Episcopal Diocese of San Diego
Stewart Sunnyslope Cemetery	Beaumont	33.9195°N 116.9650°W		Sunnyslope Cemetery; Summit Cemetery District: Stewart Sunnyslope Cemetery
Sunnylands	Rancho Mirage	33.7771°N 116.4107°W	Walter and Leonore Annenberg	Sunnylands
Temecula Massacre Cemetery	Temecula	33.4816°N 117.0907°W		Temecula Massacre Cemetery; An historical cemetery, walled but not maintained.
Temecula Public Cemetery	Temecula	33.4916°N 117.1415°W		Temecula Cemetery; History of the Temecula Public Cemetery District; The Press-Enterprise
Toro Cemetery	Thermal	33.5584°N 116.2306°W		Toro Cemetery
Welwood Murray Cemetery	Palm Springs	33.8306°N 116.5527°W	J. Smeaton Chase, Charles Farrell, Albert Frey, Hugo Montenegro, Jackie Saunders, Virginia Valli, E. Stewart Williams	Welwood Murray Cemetery; Palm Springs Cemetery District; Desert Sun
Wildomar Cemetery	Wildomar	33.6061°N 117.2755°W		Wildomar Cemetery

== See also ==
- List of cemeteries in California
- List of cemeteries in San Bernardino County, California
