= Lawrence Crossley =

American developer (1899–1962)

- Born: Lawrence Levon Crossley; March 13, 1899; Mississippi, U.S.
- Died: March 11, 1962 (aged 62); Palm Springs, California
- Resting place: Desert Memorial Park
- Years active: 1925–1962

Lawrence Levon Crossley (March 13, 1899 – March 11, 1962) was an American developer, entrepreneur, and the first African-American resident of Palm Springs, California. After moving to the city from New Orleans, Louisiana, in 1925, Crossley originally helped build the El Mirador Hotel and its associated golf course. He invested in many businesses, and developed neighborhoods throughout the Coachella Valley. Crossley was also known as a prominent supporter of the Agua Caliente Band of Cahuilla Indians.

== Early life ==
Lawrence Levon Crossley was born on March 13, 1899, on a Mississippi farm; he was later raised in New Orleans, Louisiana. Before moving to California, Crossley was well-established in the local golfing community and was also a prominent trumpeter in an early Dixieland jazz band.

== Career ==
Crossley moved to Palm Springs, California, in 1924, seeing many business opportunities in the up-and-coming city. He worked with P.T. Stevens, the owner of the El Mirador Hotel, as a handyman and chauffeur, after answering a want ad in the paper where Stevens needed a driver to take him back and forth from Los Angeles. His wife, Martha, and daughters, Margaret and Yvonne, soon followed him to Palm Springs after a month, with Martha working as Stevens' maid and cook. His cousin, Willie, also worked at the hotel during the 1930s. Stevens, noticing Crossley's acumen, promoted him to help develop the hotel and also build and maintain the first golf course in the city, the El Mirador Golf Course, recognizing Crossley's previous golfing experience. He also planted fruit trees around the hotel and raised chickens and turkeys for the hotel's restaurant. Crossley eventually became known thoroughout Palm Springs as an "intelligent" and "industrious" man whilst also becoming Stevens' "right-hand man." The hotel and course were popular with celebrities when they opened in 1928.

Crossley was able to obtain more connections through working at the hotel; at prominent lawyer Samuel Untermyer's Palm Springs estate, now the Willows Historic Palm Springs Inn, he was hired as the grounds superintendent. He was encouraged to invest by many of the businessmen he met, and was successful in his ventures, which included a café, laundromat, and a tea and cosmetics company. Crossley was able to acquire 5 acres (2.0 ha) of land for himself in the early 1930s in what is now the Ramon Mobile Home & RV Park, becoming the first example of land ownership by an African-American in Palm Springs.

Through Crossley Enterprises, Crossley's umbrella company, Crossley also developed the Tramview Village and Eagle Canyon neighborohoods of Cathedral City and the Crossly Tract neighborhood of Palm Springs. Crossley additionally served as the zanjero of the Whitewater Mutual Water Co. until 1954. In 1956, Crossley bought 20 acres (8.1 ha) of land to create Crossley Tract, a residential neighborhood which provided affordable housing to African-American families. It specifically aimed to help people who were forced to move because of new land leasing agreements. The first home was completed in 1958, and, by 1961, thirty homes were sold. The housing development was originally located east of the city limits and was only annexed by the city in the mid-1960s. A stand of tamarisk trees was planted to protect the area from the desert wind and sand.

== Personal life and death ==
Crossley married Martha Gauff on August 16, 1917; they had two daughters, Marguerita and Yvonne. Yvonne was named Miss California and won the National Negro Beauty Contest in Detroit, leading to movie offers. Both of his daughters married businessmen from Los Angeles. Prior to the 1952 United States presidential election, Crossley helped organize a rally in Palm Springs in support of Dwight D. Eisenhower. He was Catholic.

Crossley was a prominent supporter of the Agua Caliente Band of Cahuilla Indians, providing food and supplies to those in need. Being appointed as the guardian for ten members of the tribe, he also worked with Judge Hilton McCabe to help the Agua Caliente access federal resources and secure ownership of the land they were promised; Crossley worked as a liaison, bridging gaps between the government and the tribe and advocating for tribal rights. Crossley was so respected by the Ague Caliente that he was even invited to sacred tribal leadership meetings as the only non-Native American. Chief Francisco Patencio was a close friend of Crossley's and shared his tribal knowledge with him; he even inspired Crossley to create a traditional, plant-based skincare brand, facial clay, and green Mormon tea line, which he marketed as "Nature's Desert Mystery Tea".

Crossley died of a heart attack on March 11, 1962, at Palm Springs' Desert Hospital, at approximately 1:10 pm. He had previously entered the hospital at 7 am the previous day. He is buried at Desert Memorial Park.

== Legacy ==
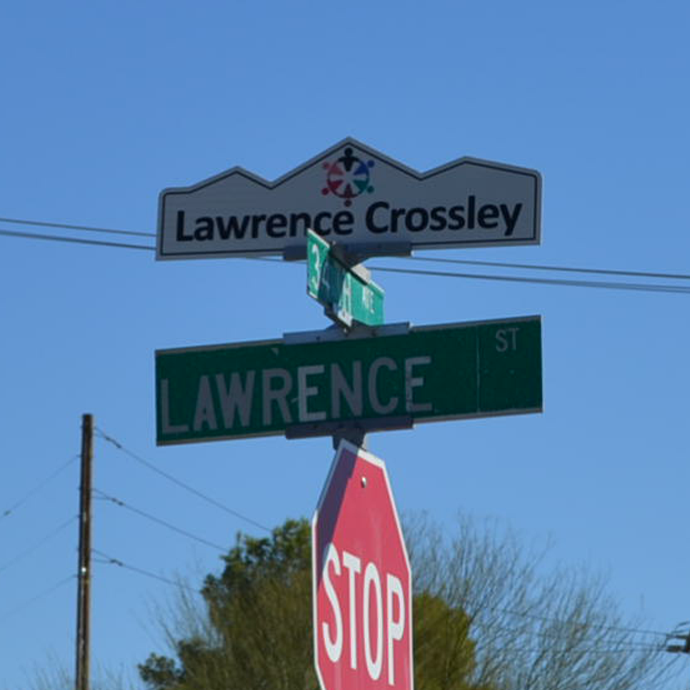
Street sign for the neighborhood of Crossley Tract, 2025

Crossley's estate after passing was valued at $1.5 million. Martha, his wife, died of a heart attack in 1964. In April 2015, a petition to rename a street on the city's east side to Lawrence Crossley Road garnered 318 signatures by citizens. The street, which ran parallel to Crossley Tract and the Tahquitz Creek Golf Course, formerly had two names, with the north section being Crossley Road and the south section being Golf Club Drive. In July 2015, the Palm Springs Planning Commission unanimously passed a resolution supporting the name change. Some city residents wrote to the city to keep the street names as-is, stating that it was too much of an inconvenience to change and that Crossley was barely known by many of the residents. The resolution stalled until August 2020, when the City Council approved the renaming.

=== Crossley Tract tamarisk tree controversy ===
In 2017, residents of Crossley Tract, led by real estate agent Trae Daniel, spoke out about the presence of the stand of invasive tamarisk trees that border the neighborhood. The trees, which form a 50 ft (15 m)-tall wall between the neighborhood and the 14th fairway of its adjacent Tahquitz Golf Course, also block the view of the San Jacinto Mountains and cause a decline in the property value. Despite the initial reason for the trees being planted being to protect the residents from desert wind and sand, it has also been claimed that the trees were planted to create a divide between the predominantly African-American neighborhood and the rest of the city. In an informal meeting in December of that year, Mayor Robert Moon and councilmember J.R. Roberts, along with other city officials, met with neighborhood residents and promised that they would remove the trees as soon as possible. Residents of the Mountain Shadows condominium were strongly opposed to the removal of the trees, stating that they enjoyed their view of the trees and the removal of the trees could cause property values to decrease even more. They also claimed that dogs and children from the neighborhood could run out onto the golf course without the trees blocking them.

The City Council unanimously voted to remove the trees in January 2018, but rejected the idea that they were planted for racially motivated reasons, saying that the trees were being removed because they were an "annoyance and a 'hazard'". They also claimed that the trees were a potential fire hazard and that the species consumed extensive amounts of water. The removal of the trees began in May later that year. It was estimated to have cost the city $170,000, including the expense of removing the chain link fence that separated the neighborhood residents from the trees themselves. The process was paid for using insurance funds the city received after trees on a different part of the Tahquitz Golf Course, which was city-owned, were damaged the previous year in a wind storm. Upon completion of the project, property values in the neighborhood rose over 75–100%.

In 2022, a documentary, Racist Trees, was released about the trees through Wayfarer Studios. It was directed by Mina T. Son and Sara Newens, who both had previously directed the 2014 documentary film Top Spin. It was shown at the Palm Springs International Film Festival and Big Sky Documentary Film Festival.
