= Forest Lawn Cemetery (Cathedral City) =

Mausoleum in California, near Palm Springs

Forest Lawn Memorial Park
- Interactive map of Forest Lawn Memorial Park

Details
- Established: 1992
- Location: 69-855 E. Ramon Road; Cathedral City, California
- Country: United States
- Coordinates: 33°48′55″N 116°26′29″W
- Type: Private
- Owned by: Forest Lawn Memorial-Parks & Mortuaries
- Website: Forest Lawn Cathedral City; Forest Lawn Burial Site Locator
- Find a Grave: Forest Lawn Memorial Park

Forest Lawn Memorial Park (Cathedral City), renamed from Palm Springs Mortuary & Mausoleum in 2005, is a mausoleum in Cathedral City, California near Palm Springs. It is operated by Forest Lawn Memorial-Parks & Mortuaries.

== Notable interments ==
Among those interred here are:

- Elisabeth Brooks, also known as Elisabeth Brooks Luytes (1951–1997), actress
- Shirley Burkovich (1933–2022), baseball player
- John Conte (1915–2006), actor, television station owner
- Frantisek Daniel (1926–1996), writer, producer, director
- Mack David (1912–1993), composer (moved to Mount Sinai because he was Jewish)
- Victoria "Vicki" Draves (1924–2010), Olympic athlete
- Alice Faye (1915–1998), singer and actress
- L. Wolfe Gilbert (1886–1970), composer
- Phil Harris (1904–1995), singer, bandleader, and actor
- Billy Herrington (1969–2018), model, pornographic film actor
- Rock Hudson (1925–1985), actor (cenotaph, ashes scattered at sea)
- Dorothy Kamenshek (1925–2010), baseball player
- Francis Lederer (1899–2000), actor
- Gavin MacLeod (1931–2021), actor
- Guy Madison (1922–1996), actor
- George Montgomery (1916–2000), actor
- George Nader (1921–2002), actor (cenotaph is marked here, but his ashes were scattered at sea)
- Papa John Phillips (1935–2001), singer, songwriter, composer
- Michael Rizzitello (1927–2005), mobster
- Harold Robbins (1916–1997), novelist
- Irv Robbins (1917–2008), co-founder of Baskin-Robbins
- Charles 'Buddy' Rogers (1904–1999), actor, musician, humanitarian, third husband of Mary Pickford
- Hank Sanicola (c. 1914–1974), pianist, music publisher, manager and businessman, close friend of Frank Sinatra
- Dinah Shore (1916–1994), singer, actress and talk show host
- Jerry Vale (1930–2014), singer
- Ken Venturi (1931–2013), professional golfer and golf broadcaster, close friend of Frank Sinatra
- Nancy Wilson (1937–2018), singer
- Donald Woods (1906–1998), Canadian actor
- Jane Wyman (1917–2007), actress

== See also ==
- Coachella Valley Public Cemetery – in nearby Indio, California
- Desert Memorial Park – across the street from Forest Lawn
- List of cemeteries in California
- List of cemeteries in Riverside County, California
