= Benjamin F. Montoya =

United States Navy rear admiral (1935–2015)

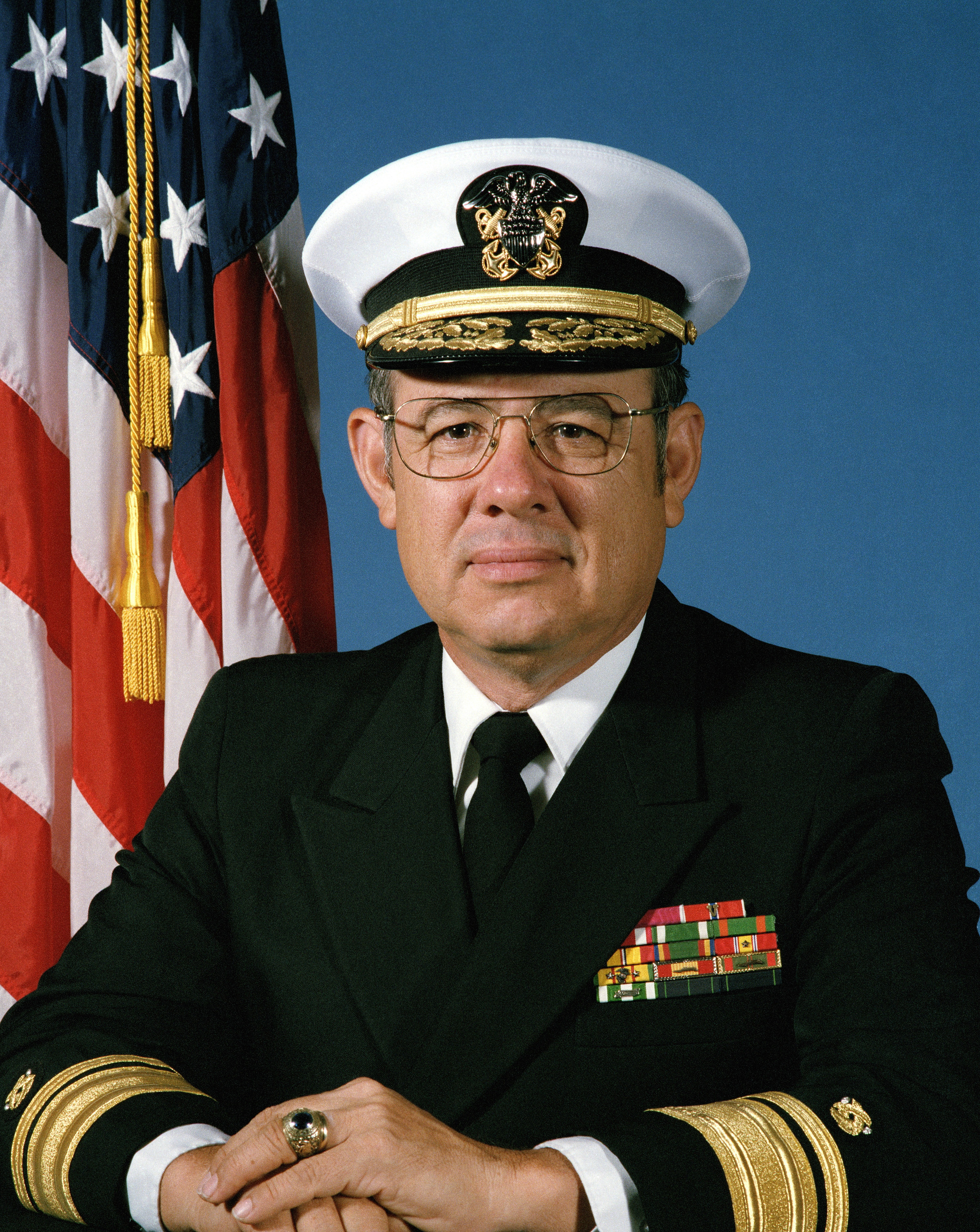
- Born: May 24, 1935; Indio, California, U.S.
- Died: December 19, 2015 (aged 80)
- Allegiance: United States of America
- Branch: United States Navy
- Service years: 1958–1989
- Rank: Rear Admiral
- Commands: Naval Facilities Engineering Command; Western Division Engineering Command, San Bruno; Navy Public Works Center, San Diego; Navy Environmental Quality Division
- Conflicts: Vietnam War
- Awards: Defense Distinguished Service Medal; Legion of Merit (2); Bronze Star Medal; Meritorious Service Medal

Benjamin Franklin Montoya (May 24, 1935 – December 19, 2015) was a United States Navy rear admiral. He served as commanding officer of Naval Facilities Engineering Command from 1987 to 1989. Montoya was the first Hispanic chief of naval civil engineers.

== Early life and education ==
Born in Indio, California and raised in La Quinta, California, Montoya was a 1953 graduate of Coachella Valley High School. He was a football quarterback, baseball pitcher and tennis player. Montoya next attended the California Polytechnic Institute for one year before being appointed to the United States Naval Academy. While there, he pitched for the baseball team and served as team captain during his final year. Montoya graduated with a B.S. degree in June 1958 and was commissioned as an ensign in the Navy Civil Engineer Corps.

Montoya earned a second bachelor's degree in civil engineering from the Rensselaer Polytechnic Institute in June 1960. He later received an M.S. degree in sanitary engineering from the Georgia Institute of Technology in June 1968 and a J.D. degree from the Georgetown University Law School in June 1980.

== Military career ==
In 1960, Montoya was assigned as resident engineer at the Long Beach Naval Shipyard. Montoya later served two tours in Vietnam, supervising Seabee construction of the first base camp in Da Nang and later of the Marine base at Chu Lai.

In 1974, Montoya became director of the Navy Environmental Quality Division in Washington, D.C. In 1981, he became commanding officer of the Navy Public Works Center in San Diego, California. In 1984, Montoya assumed leadership of the Western Division Engineering Command in San Bruno, California. His promotion to commodore was approved by the United States Senate on 16 October 1985.

In 1986, Montoya was appointed director of the Shore Activities Division under the Deputy Chief of Naval Operations for Logistics in Washington, D.C. Approved for promotion to rear admiral on 15 May 1987, he then became commanding officer of Naval Facilities Engineering Command and chief of the Civil Engineer Corps. Montoya retired from active duty in November 1989.

== Later life ==
From 1993 to 2000, Montoya served as chief executive officer of the Public Service Company of New Mexico.

In November 1994, President Bill Clinton appointed Montoya to the Board of Visitors of the U.S. Naval Academy. He served as chairman of the board for two years.

On February 8, 1995, President Clinton nominated Montoya to be a Defense Base Realignment and Closure Commissioner. In September 2006, he was appointed to the Space Operations Committee of the NASA Advisory Council.

Montoya was diagnosed with cancer in 2013. After his death in December 2015, he was interred with full military honors at Coachella Valley Cemetery on January 6, 2016.

== Awards ==
His military awards include the Defense Distinguished Service Medal, two awards of the Legion of Merit, the Bronze Star Medal with Combat "V" and the Meritorious Service Medal.

Montoya was inducted into the National Academy of Engineering in 2001 and the National Academy of Construction in 2006.

== Personal ==
Montoya was the son of Benjamin Conrado Montoya (1907–1990) and Margaret (Ramirez) Montoya (1913–2007). He had three younger brothers.

Montoya married Virginia Cox on June 5, 1958. They had five sons, two daughters and seventeen grandchildren.
