= William Powell =

American actor (1892–1984)

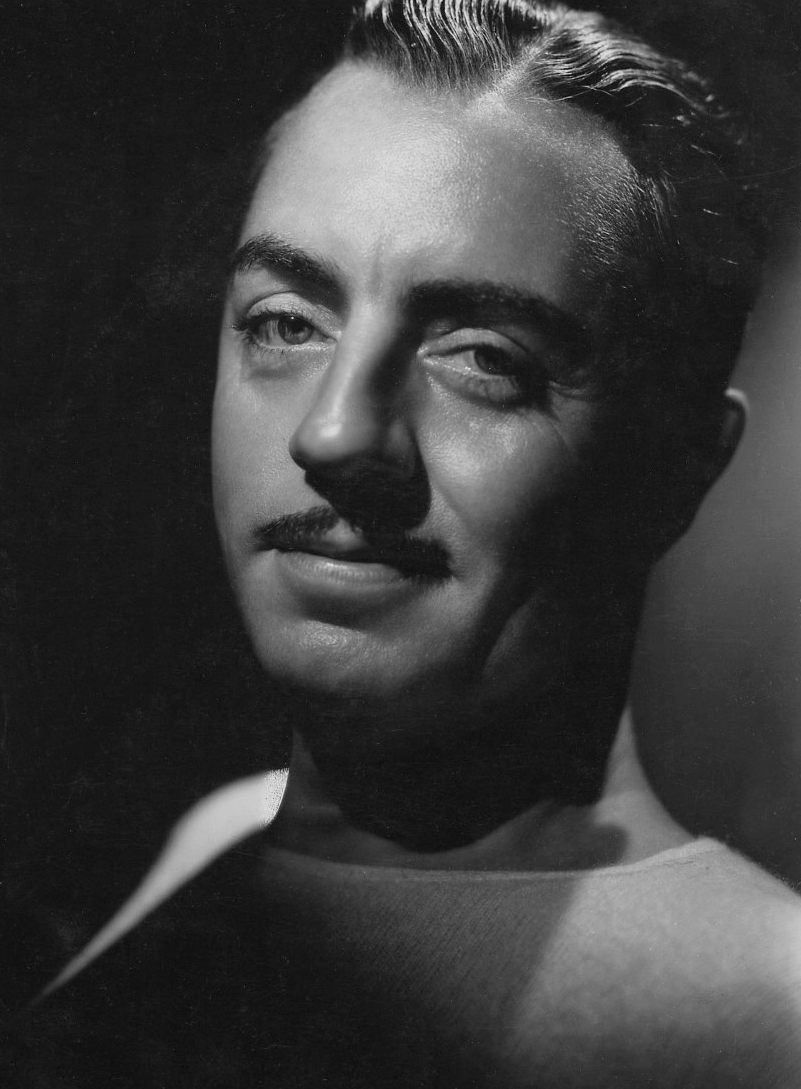
- 1936 portrait for Metro-Goldwyn-Mayer by George Hurrell
- Born: William Horatio Powell; July 29, 1892; Pittsburgh, Pennsylvania, U.S.
- Died: March 5, 1984 (aged 91); Palm Springs, California, U.S.
- Resting place: Desert Memorial Park, Cathedral City, California, U.S.
- Other name: Bill Powell
- Occupation: Actor
- Years active: 1911–1955
- Spouses: Eileen Wilson (m. 1915; div. 1930) Carole Lombard (m. 1931; div. 1933) Diana Lewis (m. 1940)
- Partner: Jean Harlow (1934–1937)
- Children: William David Powell

William Horatio Powell (July 29, 1892 – March 5, 1984) was an American actor, known primarily for his film career. Under contract with Metro-Goldwyn-Mayer, he was paired with Myrna Loy in 14 films, including the Thin Man series based on the Nick and Nora Charles characters created by Dashiell Hammett. Powell was nominated for the Academy Award for Best Actor three times: for The Thin Man (1934), My Man Godfrey (1936), and Life with Father (1947).

== Early life ==
Powell was born in Pittsburgh in 1892, the only child of Nettie Manila (née Brady) and Horatio Warren Powell, an accountant. In 1907, young William moved with his family to Kansas City, Missouri, where he graduated from Central High School four years later.

== Career ==
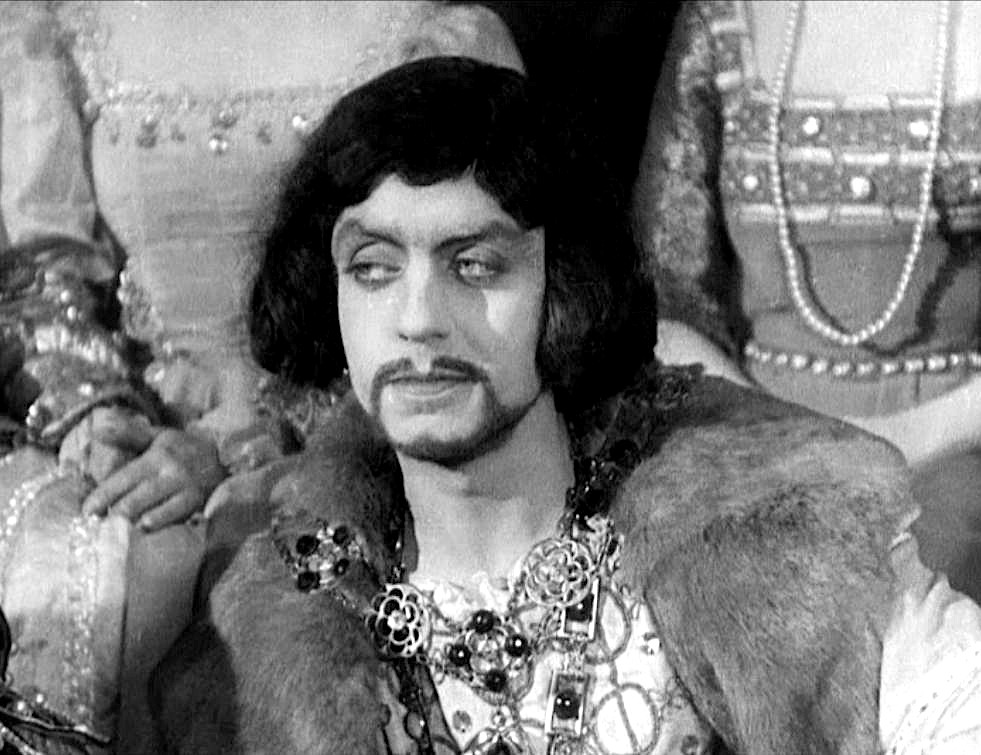
Powell in When Knighthood Was in Flower, 1922

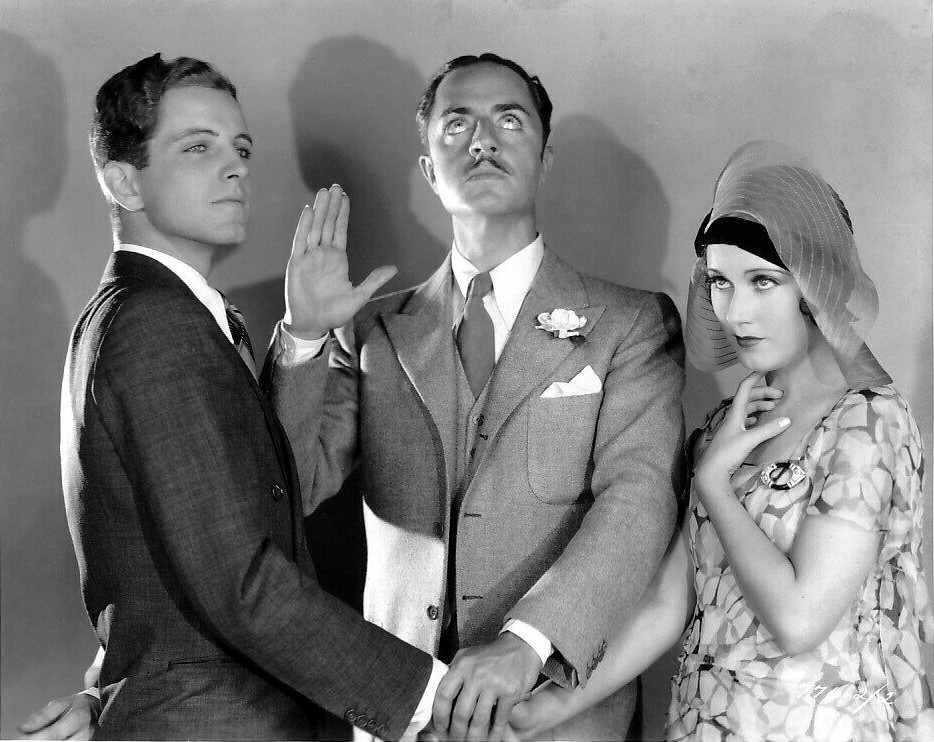
Phillips Holmes, Powell and Fay Wray in Pointed Heels, 1929

After high school, Powell enrolled at the University of Kansas to study law, but after a week he relocated to New York City, where he attended the American Academy of Dramatic Arts. In 1912, Powell left the AADA, and began working in vaudeville and stock companies. He also appeared on Broadway. Powell began his Hollywood career in 1922, in a production of Sherlock Holmes with John Barrymore. He performed as Francis I in When Knighthood Was in Flower with Marion Davies.

Powell remained under contract to Paramount throughout the 1920s, before signing with Warner Bros.

Powell portrayed a vengeful film director in the silent movie The Last Command (1928). His first starring role was Philo Vance in The Canary Murder Case (1929). He played Vance at Paramount Pictures four times. His strong stage-developed voice became a powerful asset when talking pictures were introduced. He went on to star opposite Kay Francis in seven pre-Code films, starting with "Street of Chance" (1930) and including "Jewel Robbery" (1932), in which he plays a thief who proffers marijuana cigarettes to his victims.

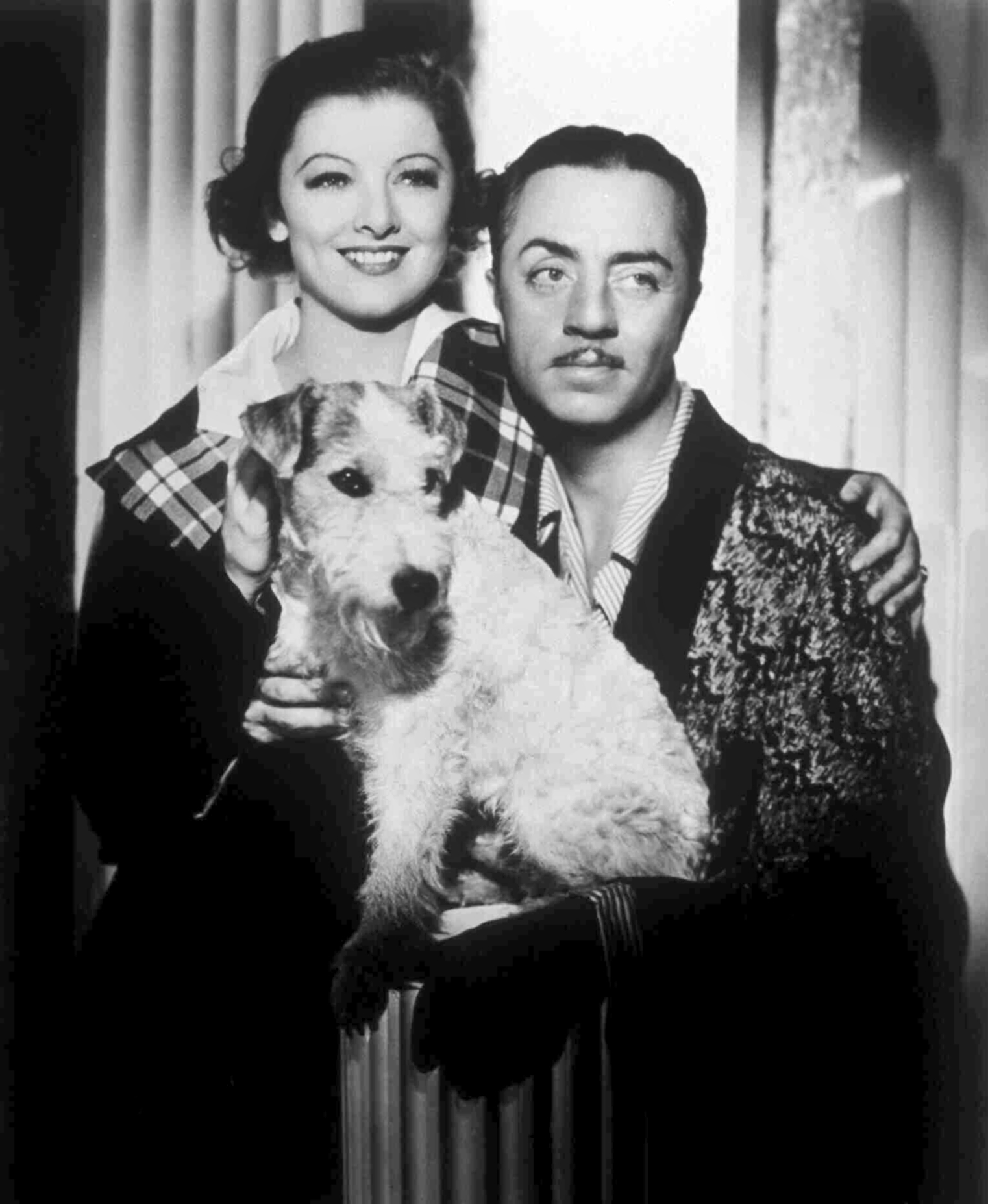
Promotional photo for The Thin Man (1934) with Powell, co-star Myrna Loy, and Skippy as Asta

Powell appeared as Nick Charles in six Thin Man films, beginning with The Thin Man in 1934, based upon Dashiell Hammett's novel. This movie provided Powell with his first Academy Award nomination, in 1935

Powell starred in The Great Ziegfeld, (1936), opposite his The Thin Man co-star, Myrna Loy, who played Ziegfeld's wife, Billie Burke. In 1937, Powell received his second Academy Award nomination for the comedy My Man Godfrey.

In 1935, he starred with Jean Harlow in Reckless. In 1936, Harlow and Powell appeared in Libeled Lady, and they became romantically involved off-set. He gave her a handsome ring, but did not ask her to marry him, so she referred to it as her "unengagement ring". Powell had been unhappy with his previous marriage to popular actress Carole Lombard, and this apparently kept him from entering a similar arrangement with Harlow, who was a sex symbol to the film-going public during that time. They kept company but did not live together. Harlow fell ill from undiagnosed kidney failure while working on a film with Clark Gable, and died before the film was completed, from uremia, at age 26 in June 1937.

Powell received his third Academy Award nomination in 1947 for his role as Clarence Day Sr. in Life with Father. His last film was playing the character Doc in 1955's Mister Roberts.

== Personal life ==
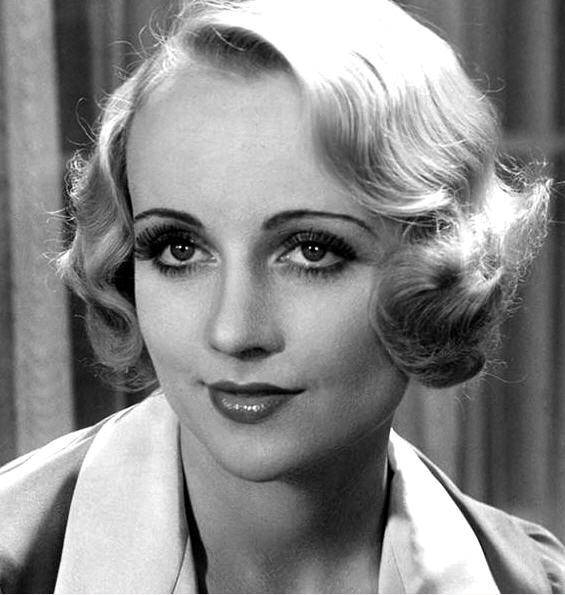
Carole Lombard

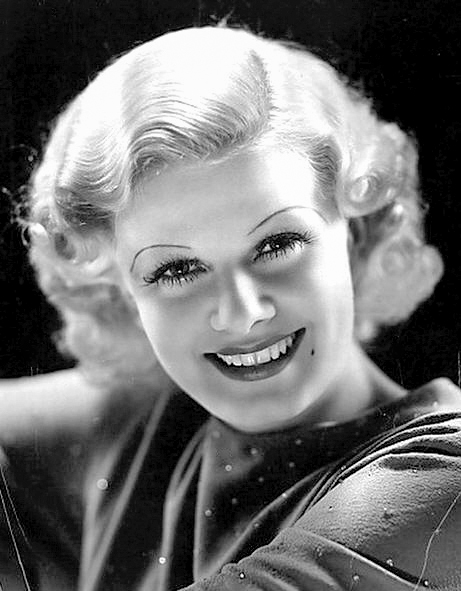
Jean Harlow

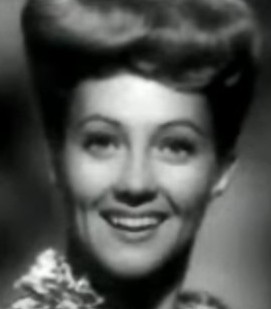
Diana Lewis

On April 15, 1915, Powell married Eileen Wilson, who was born Julia Mary Tierney. The couple had a son, William David Powell. They divorced in 1930. Powell's son became a television writer and producer before a period of ill health and depression led to his suicide in 1968.

On June 26, 1931, Powell married actress Carole Lombard. They divorced in 1933, but starred in My Man Godfrey three years later. Powell was devastated by her death in an airplane crash in 1942.

He was romantically involved with Jean Harlow, his co-star in Reckless (1935), until her unexpected death from illness in 1937.

On January 6, 1940, three weeks after they met, Powell married his third wife, actress Diana Lewis, who retired from her film career to be his full-time wife. They remained married until his death in 1984.

A Republican, Powell supported Thomas Dewey in both the 1944 and 1948 United States presidential elections.

== Cancer ==
In March 1938, Powell was diagnosed with rectal cancer. He underwent surgery and experimental radium treatment, which put the disease in full remission within two years. Given his own health and sorrow over Jean Harlow's death, Powell did not undertake any film roles for more than a year during this period.

== Death ==
Powell died in Palm Springs, California, on March 5, 1984, at the age of 91 from pneumonia. He is buried at the Desert Memorial Park in Cathedral City, California, near his third wife, Diana Lewis.

== Honors ==
=== Academy Awards nominations ===
- 1934 Best Actor – The Thin Man
- 1936 Best Actor – My Man Godfrey
- 1947 Best Actor – Life with Father

=== Other awards ===
New York Film Critics Circle Award for Best Actor in 1947 for Life with Father and The Senator Was Indiscreet.

William Powell has a star on the Hollywood Walk of Fame at 1636 Vine Street.

In 1992, a Golden Palm Star on the Palm Springs, California, Walk of Stars was dedicated to him.

== Radio appearances ==
Year	Program	Episode/source
1936	Lux Radio Theatre	The Thin Man
1938	Lux Radio Theatre	My Man Godfrey
1939	Lux Radio Theatre	One Way Passage
1939	Lux Radio Theatre	The Ex-Mrs. Bradford
1940	The Campbell Playhouse	It Happened One Night
1940	Lux Radio Theatre	Love Affair
1940	Lux Radio Theatre	After the Thin Man
1940	Lux Radio Theatre	Manhattan Melodrama
1941	Lux Radio Theatre	Hired Wife
1942	Lux Radio Theatre	Love Crazy
1943	Lux Radio Theatre	The Lady Has Plans
1944	Lux Radio Theatre	Shadow of a Doubt
1944	Lux Radio Theatre	Suspicion
1946	Reader's Digest Radio Edition	He Fell in Love with a Picture
1948	Lux Radio Theatre	I Love You Again
1948	Lux Radio Theatre	Mr. Peabody and the Mermaid
1949	Screen Directors Playhouse	Love Crazy
1953	Suspense	"The Man Who Cried Wolf"

== Filmography ==
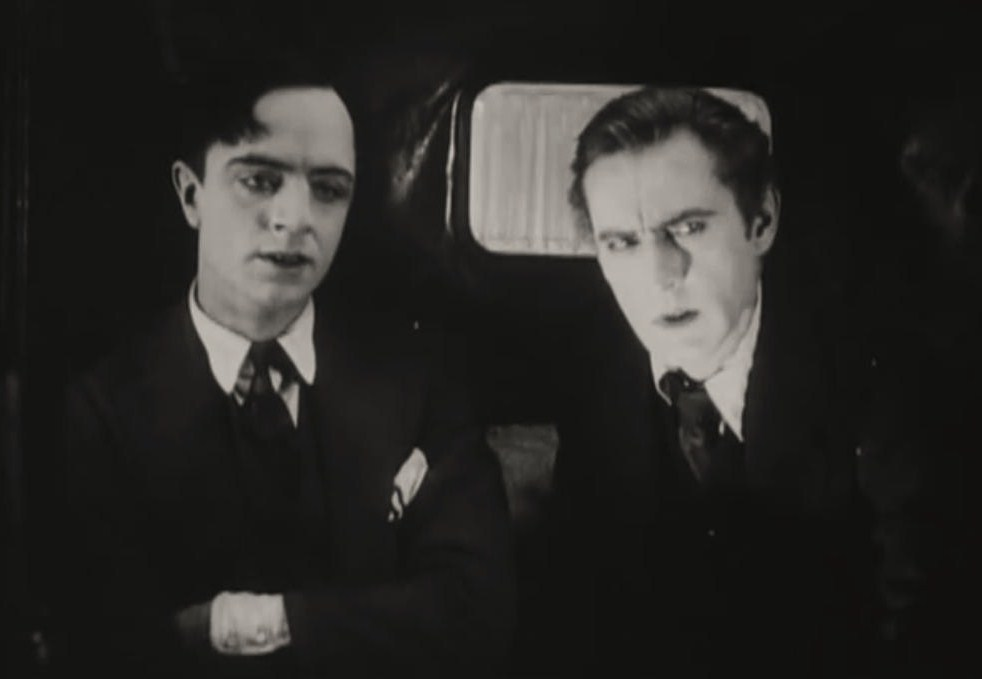
Powell and John Barrymore in Sherlock Holmes (1922)

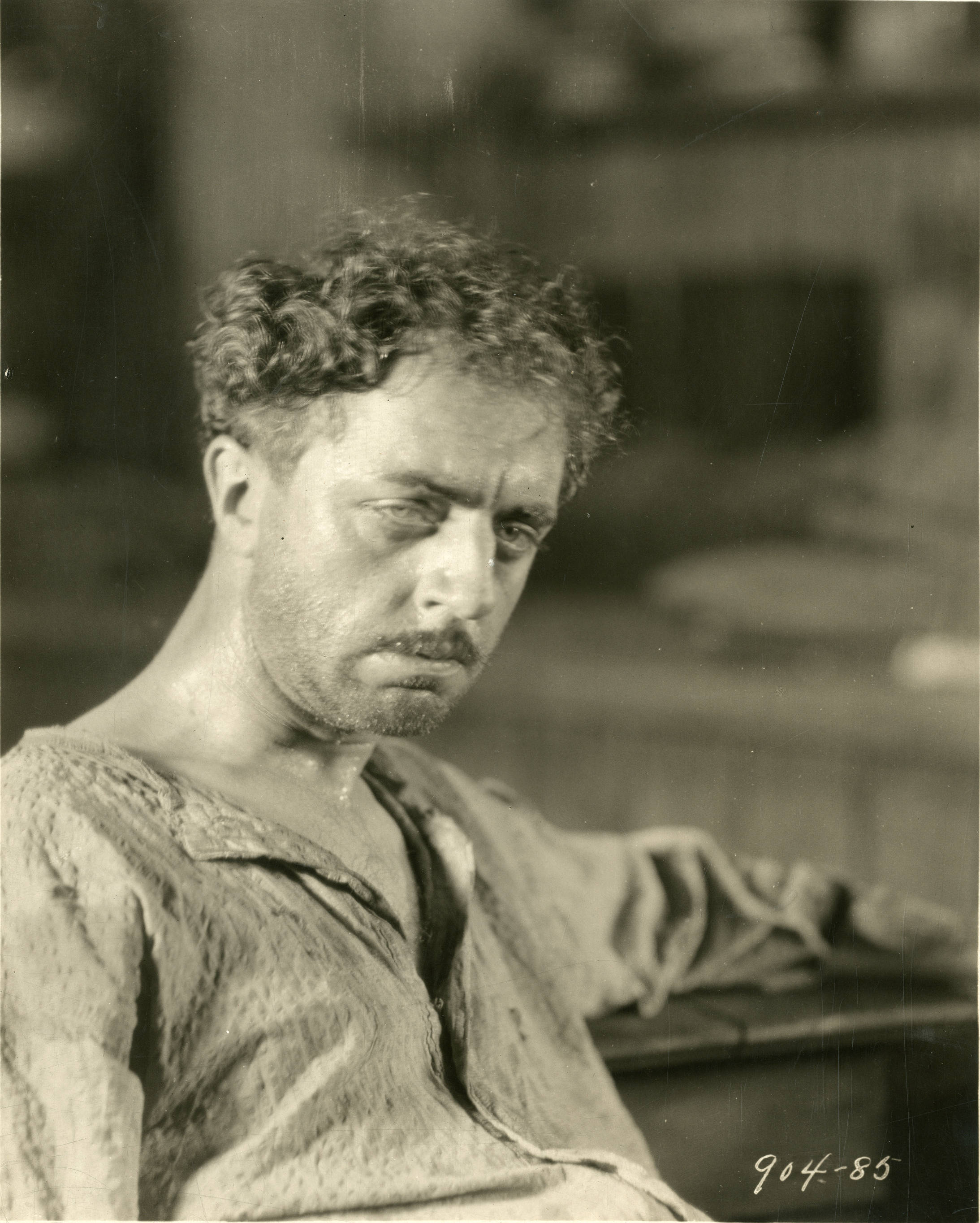
Powell as George Wilson in The Great Gatsby (1926)

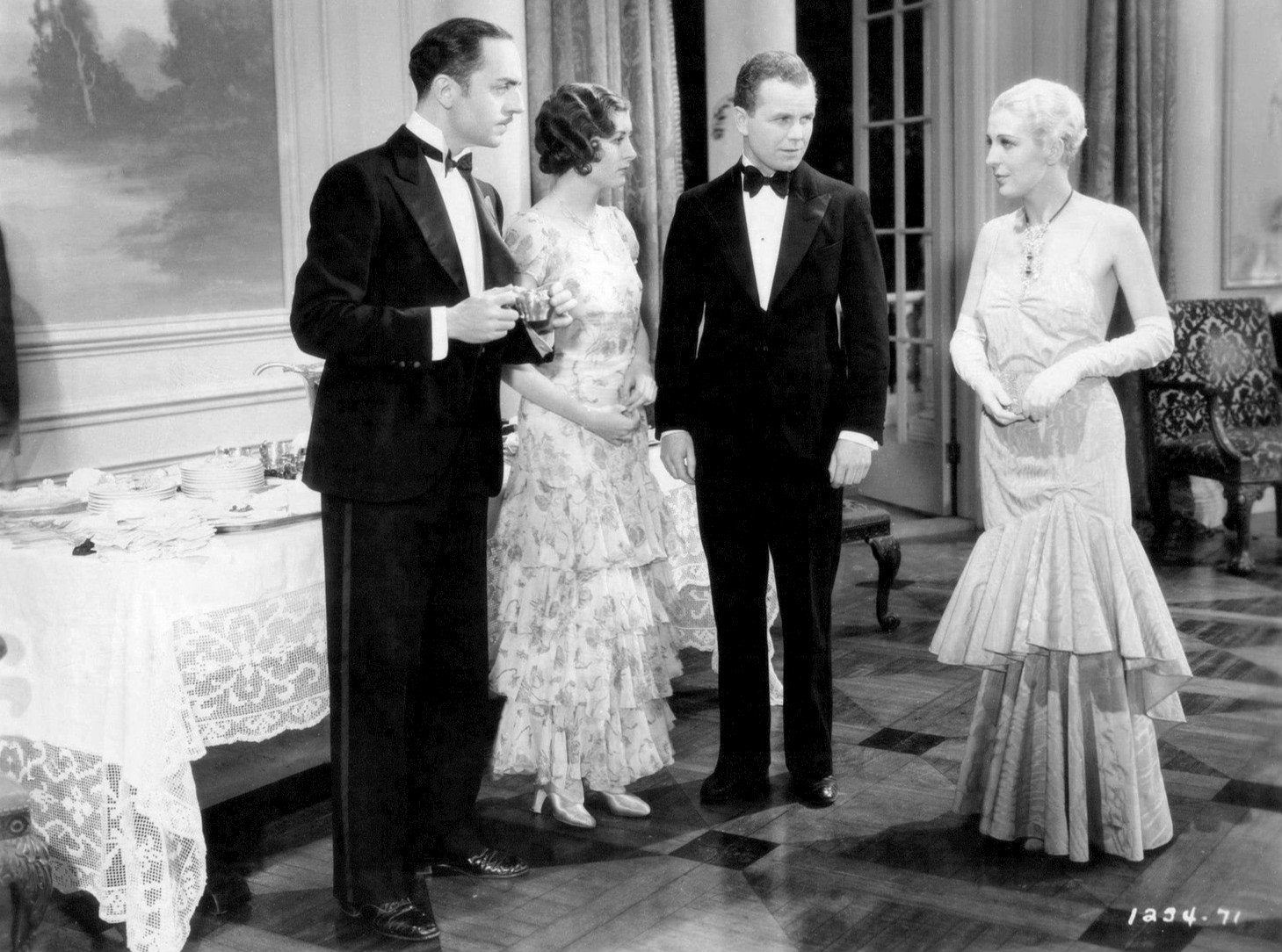
Powell, Marion Shilling, Regis Toomey, Natalie Moorhead in Shadow of the Law (1930)

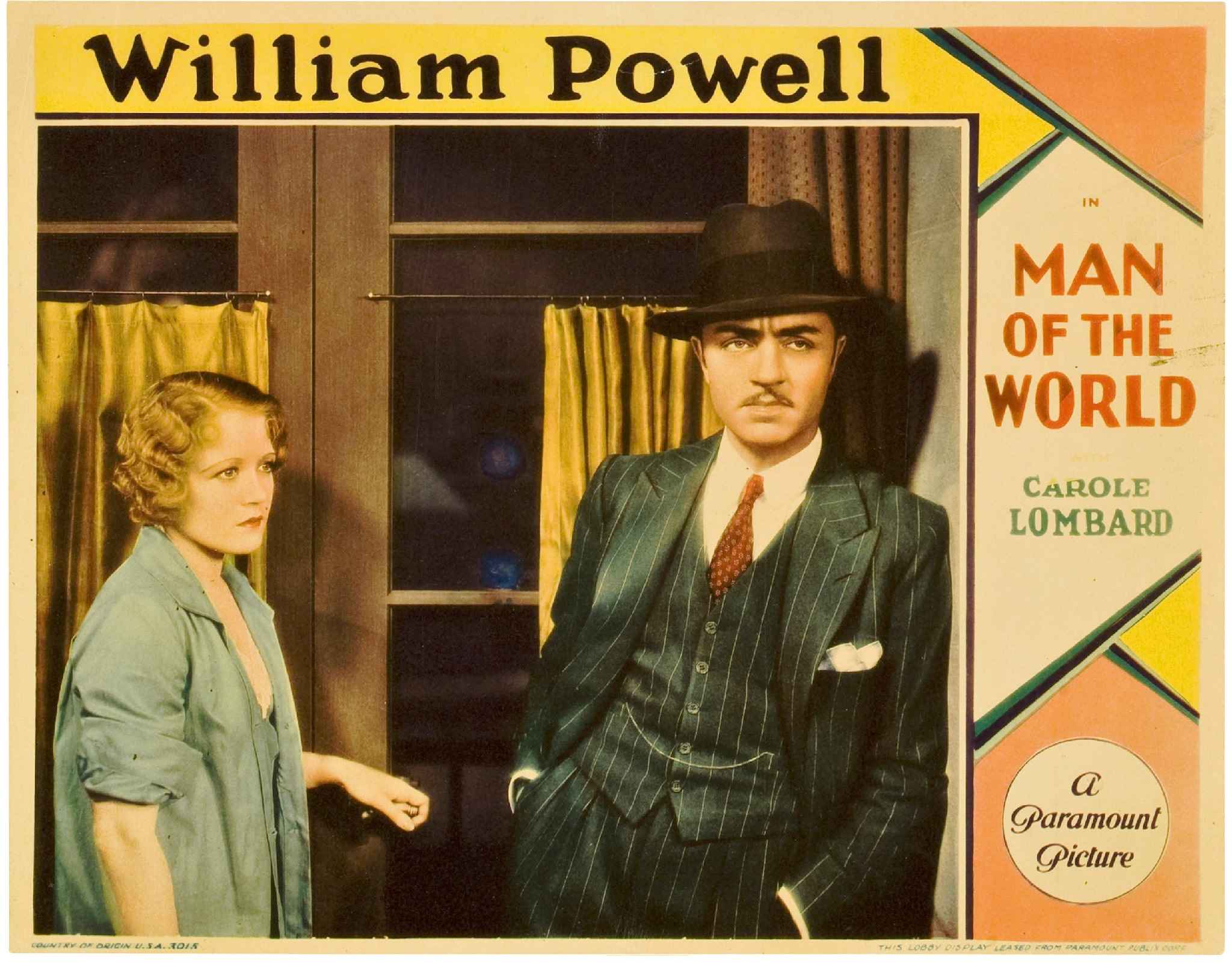
Lobby card with Wynne Gibson in Man of the World (1931)

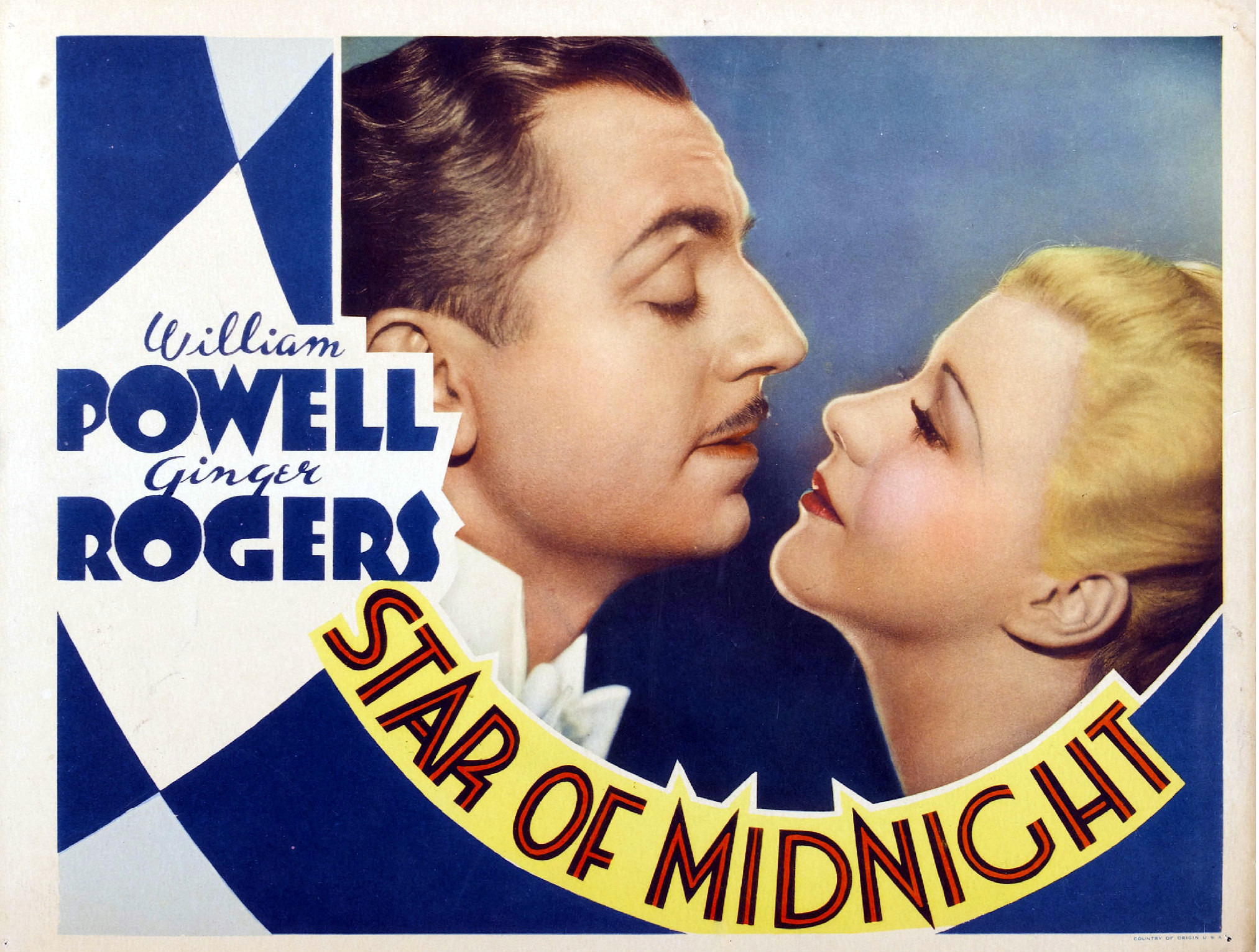
Lobby card with Powell and Ginger Rogers in Star of Midnight (1935)

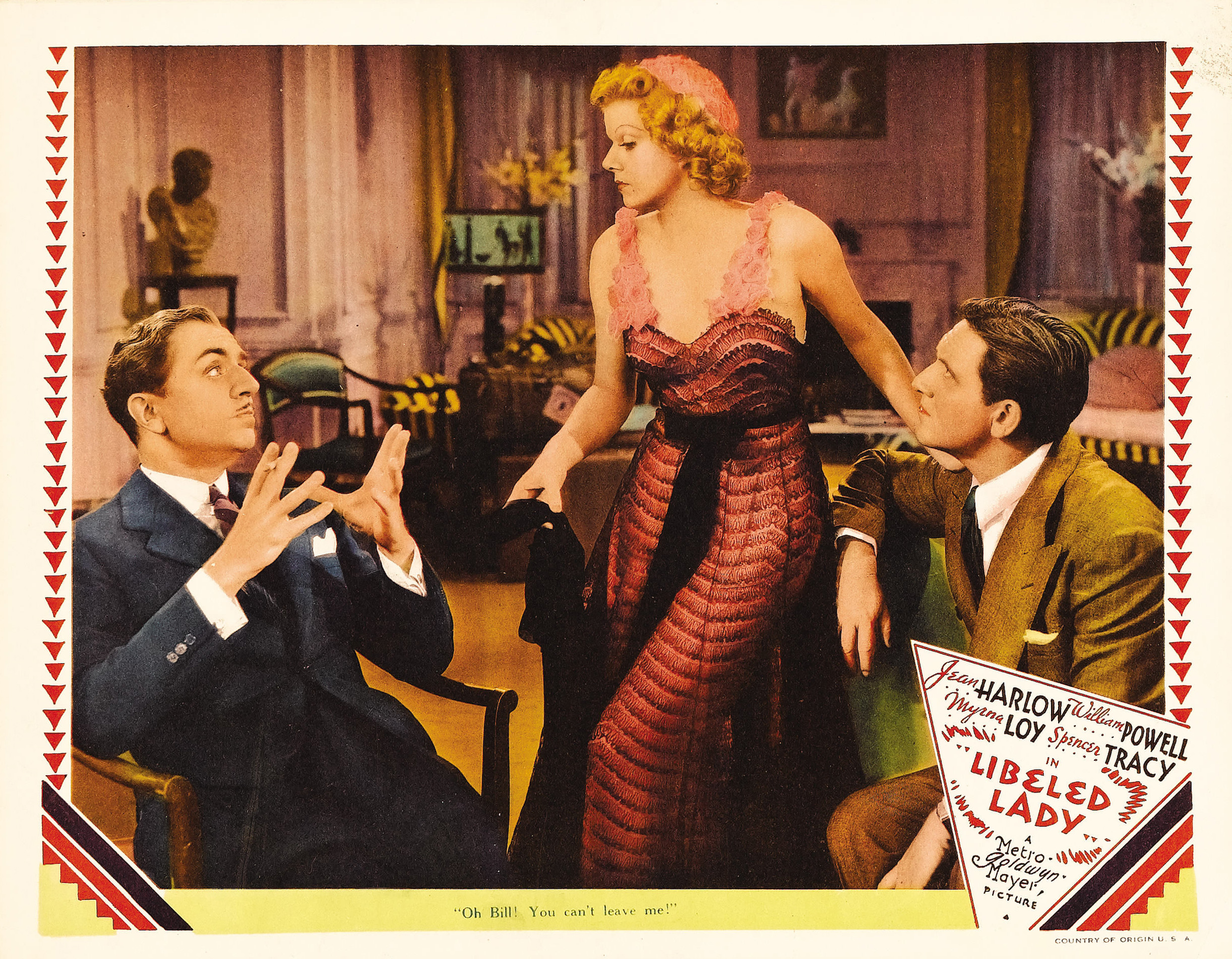
Lobby card with Powell, Jean Harlow and Spencer Tracy in Libeled Lady (1936)

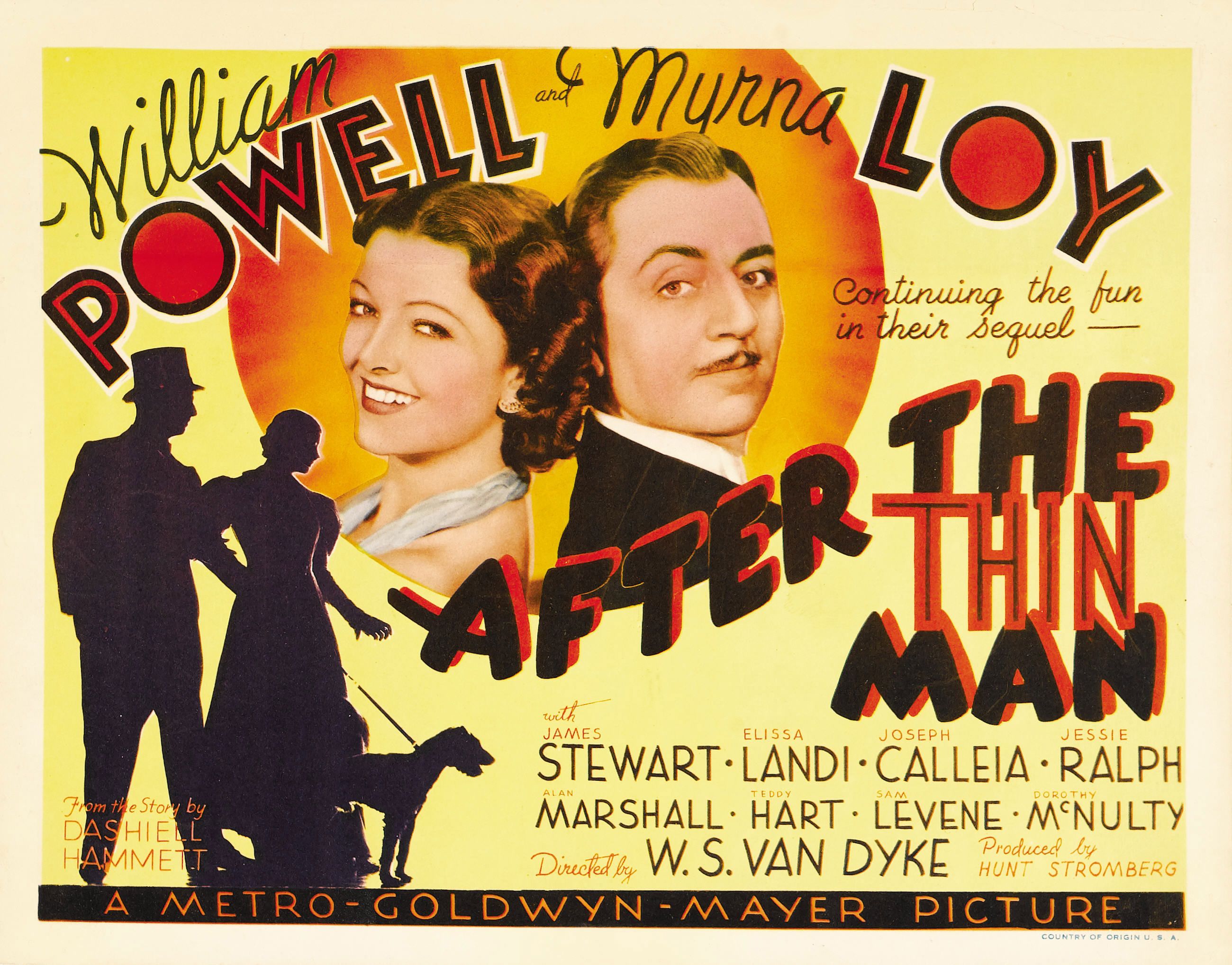
Lobby card featuring Myrna Loy and Powell in After the Thin Man (1936)

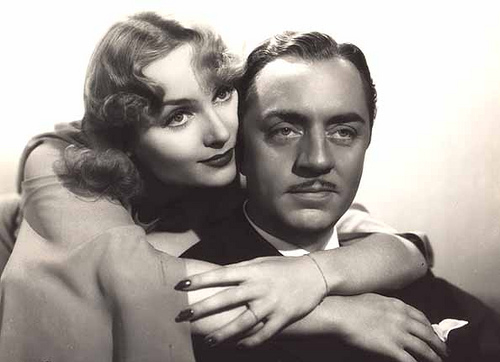
Carole Lombard and Powell in My Man Godfrey (1936)

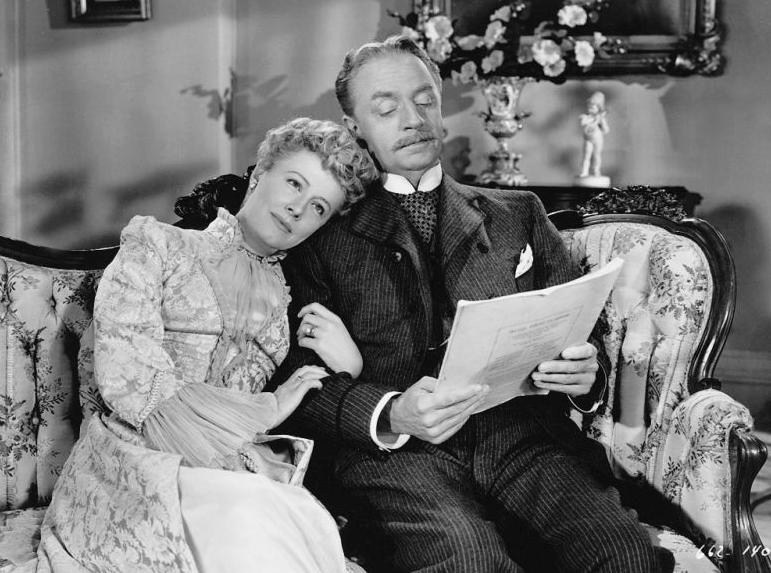
Irene Dunne and Powell in Life with Father (1947)

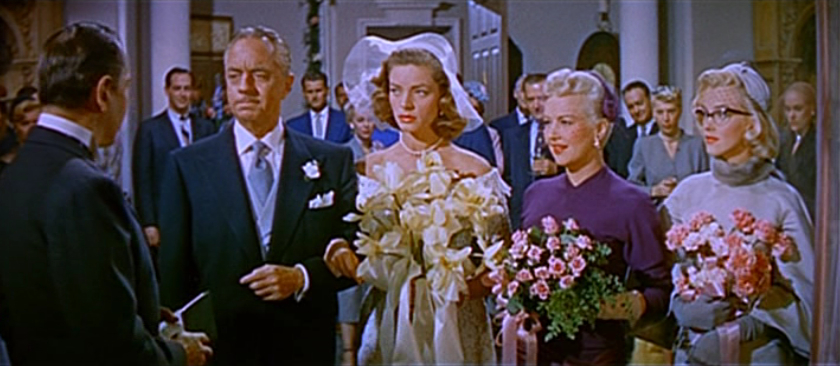
Powell, Lauren Bacall, Betty Grable, and Marilyn Monroe in How to Marry a Millionaire (1953)

Year	Title	Role	Notes
1922	Sherlock Holmes	Foreman Wells	
1922	When Knighthood Was in Flower	Francis I	
1922	Outcast	DeValle	Lost film
1923	The Bright Shawl	Gaspar De Vaca	
1923	Under the Red Robe	Duke of Orleans	
1924	Dangerous Money	Prince Arnolfo da Pescia	Lost film
1924	Romola	Tito Melema	
1925	Too Many Kisses	Julio	
1925	Faint Perfume	Barnaby Powers	Lost film
1925	My Lady's Lips	Scott Seddon	
1925	The Beautiful City	Nick Di Silva	Lost film
1925	The New Commandment		Lost film Uncredited
1926	White Mice	Roddy Forrester	Incomplete film
1926	Sea Horses	Lorenzo Salvia	Lost film
1926	Desert Gold	Snake Landree	Lost film
1926	The Runaway	Jack Harrison	Lost film
1926	Aloma of the South Seas	Van Templeton	Lost film
1926	Beau Geste	Boldini	
1926	The Great Gatsby	George Wilson	Lost film Trailer extant
1926	Tin Gods	Tony Santelli	Lost film
1927	New York	Trent Regan	Lost film
1927	Love's Greatest Mistake	Don Kendall	Lost film
1927	Special Delivery	Harold Jones	
1927	Senorita	Manuel Oliveros	
1927	Time to Love	Prince Alado	Lost film
1927	Paid to Love	Prince Eric	
1927	Nevada	Clan Dillon	
1927	She's a Sheik	Kada	
1928	The Last Command	Lev Andreyev	
1928	Beau Sabreur	Becque	Lost film Trailer extant
1928	Feel My Pulse	Her Nemesis	
1928	Partners in Crime	Smith	
1928	The Drag Net	Dapper Frank Trent	Lost film
1928	The Vanishing Pioneer	John Murdock	Lost film
1928	Forgotten Faces	Froggy	
1928	Interference	Philip Voaze	Powell's sound debut
1929	The Canary Murder Case	Philo Vance	
1929	The Four Feathers	Capt. William Trench	
1929	The Greene Murder Case	Philo Vance	
1929	Charming Sinners	Karl Kraley	
1929	Pointed Heels	Robert Courtland	
1930	Behind the Make-Up	Gardoni	
1930	Street of Chance	John D. Marsden / 'Natural' Davis	
1930	The Benson Murder Case	Philo Vance	
1930	Paramount on Parade	Philo Vance	
1930	Shadow of the Law	John Nelson	
1930	For the Defense	William Foster	
1931	Man of the World	Michael Trevor	
1931	Ladies' Man	Jamie Darricott	
1931	The Road to Singapore	Hugh Dawltry	
1932	High Pressure	Gar Evans	
1932	Jewel Robbery	The Robber	
1932	One Way Passage	Dan Hardesty	
1932	Lawyer Man	Anton Adam	
1933	Private Detective 62	Free	
1933	Double Harness	John Fletcher	
1933	The Kennel Murder Case	Philo Vance	
1934	Fashions of 1934	Sherwood Nash	
1934	Manhattan Melodrama	Jim Wade	
1934	The Thin Man	Nick Charles	
1934	The Key	Capt. Bill Tennant	
1934	Evelyn Prentice	John Prentice	
1935	Star of Midnight	Clay 'Dal' Dalzell	
1935	Reckless	Ned Riley	
1935	Escapade	Fritz	
1935	Rendezvous	Lieutenant Bill Gordon	
1936	The Great Ziegfeld	Florenz Ziegfeld Jr.	
1936	The Ex-Mrs. Bradford	Dr. Lawrence Bradford	
1936	My Man Godfrey	Godfrey Parke (aka Smith)	
1936	Libeled Lady	Bill Chandler	
1936	After the Thin Man	Nick Charles	
1937	The Last of Mrs. Cheney	Charles	
1937	The Emperor's Candlesticks	Baron Stephan Wolensky	
1937	Double Wedding	Charles Lodge	
1938	The Baroness and the Butler	Johann Porok	
1939	Another Thin Man	Nick Charles	
1940	I Love You Again	Larry Wilson a.k.a. George Carey	
1941	Love Crazy	Steve Ireland	
1941	Shadow of the Thin Man	Nick Charles	
1942	Crossroads	David Talbot, a.k.a. Jean Pelletier	
1943	The Youngest Profession	Himself	
1944	The Heavenly Body	William S. Whitley	
1945	The Thin Man Goes Home	Nick Charles	
1945	Ziegfeld Follies	Florenz Ziegfeld Jr.	
1946	The Hoodlum Saint	Terence Ellerton 'Terry' O'Neill	
1946	The Great Morgan	Himself	Voice, Uncredited
1947	Life with Father	Clarence Day	
1947	Song of the Thin Man	Nick Charles	
1947	The Senator Was Indiscreet	Senator Melvin G. Ashton	
1948	Mr. Peabody and the Mermaid	Mr. Arthur Peabody	
1949	Take One False Step	Professor Andrew Gentling	
1949	Dancing in the Dark	Emery Slade	
1951	It's a Big Country	Professor	
1952	The Treasure of Lost Canyon	Homer 'Doc' Brown	
1953	The Girl Who Had Everything	Steve Latimer	
1953	How to Marry a Millionaire	J.D. Hanley	
1955	Mister Roberts	Doc	(final film)

=== Short subjects ===
- Screen Snapshots (1932)
- Hollywood on Parade No. A-12 (1933)
- Screen Snapshots: The Skolsky Party (1946)

=== Box office rankings ===
- 1935 - 15th
- 1936 - 13th
- 1937 - 5th, 6th (UK)
- 1938 - 25th, 10th (UK)
- 1940 - 25th
- 1941 - 25th

== See also ==
- List of actors with Academy Award nominations

== Bibliography ==
- Bryant, Roger. William Powell: The Life and Films. Jefferson, North Carolina: McFarland & Co., 2006. ISBN 0-7864-2602-0.
- Christensen, Lawrence O., et al. Dictionary of Missouri Biography. Columbia, Maryland: University of Missouri Press, 1999. ISBN 0-8262-1222-0.
- Francisco, Charles. Gentleman: The William Powell Story . New York: St Martins Press, 1985. ISBN 0-312-32103-1.
