= Eileen Wilson Powell =

American actress

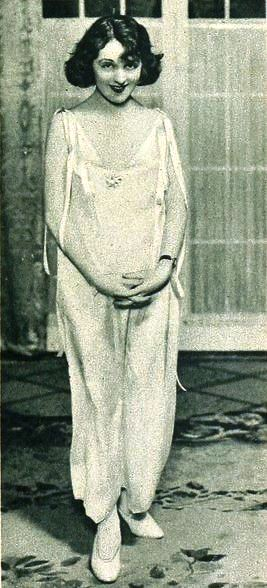
- Eileen Wilson Powell in No More Blondes
- Born: Julia Mary Tierney; April 19, 1894; New York City, NY, U.S.
- Died: September 12, 1942 (aged 48); New York City, New York, U.S.
- Other name: Julie Powell
- Occupation: Actress
- Spouse: William Powell (m. 1915; div. 1930)
- Children: William David Powell

Eileen Wilson Powell (April 19, 1894 – September 12, 1942), born Julia Mary Tierney, was an American actress.

== Early life ==
Julia Mary Tierney was born in New York City, the daughter of Thomas P. Tierney and Mary L. Hyde Tierney.

== Career ==
Wilson appeared in Broadway and touring shows, including Within the Law (1913), A King of Nowhere (1916), The Love Drive (1917), In for the Night (1917), No More Blondes (1920), The Lady of the Lamp (1920), East is West (1922), Partners Again (1922), The Night Duel (1926), The Little Spitfire (1926-1927), Burlesque (1927–1928), and Peter Flies High (1931).

== Personal life ==
Wilson was married to actor William Powell. They had a son, William David Powell, who became a television writer and producer. The Powells separated soon after their son's birth in 1925, and finally divorced in 1930. She died in New York City in 1942, aged 48 years, after a short illness.
