= Coachella Valley Public Cemetery =

Cemetery in Riverside County, California

Coachella Valley Public Cemetery District
- Interactive map of Coachella Valley Public Cemetery District

Details
- Established: 1927
- Location: Coachella, California
- Country: United States
- Coordinates: 33°40′11″N 116°13′02″W
- Type: Public
- Owned by: Coachella Valley Public Cemetery District
- Website: Official website
- Find a Grave: Coachella Valley Public Cemetery District
- The Political Graveyard: Coachella Valley Public Cemetery District

The Coachella Valley Public Cemetery is a cemetery in the Coachella Valley of Southern California. Located in Unincorporated Riverside County, it is near the east valley cities of Coachella, Indio, and La Quinta.

== Notable interments ==
Among those buried here are:

- Frank Bogert (1910–2009), Westerns movie star and Mayor of Palm Springs
- Frank Capra (1897–1991), film director
- Jacqueline Cochran (1906–1980), aviator
- Al McCandless (1927–2017), politician
- Benjamin Montoya (1935–2015), U.S. Navy rear admiral
- Alan O'Day (1940–2013), singer-songwriter
- Tommy Shepard (1923–1993), trombonist
- John Van Druten (1901–1957), playwright and theatre director
- Stan Wrightsman (1910–1975), jazz pianist

== See also ==
- Forest Lawn Cemetery (Cathedral City)
- Desert Memorial Park
- List of cemeteries in California
- List of cemeteries in Riverside County, California
