= Desert Memorial Park =

Cemetery in Cathedral City, California

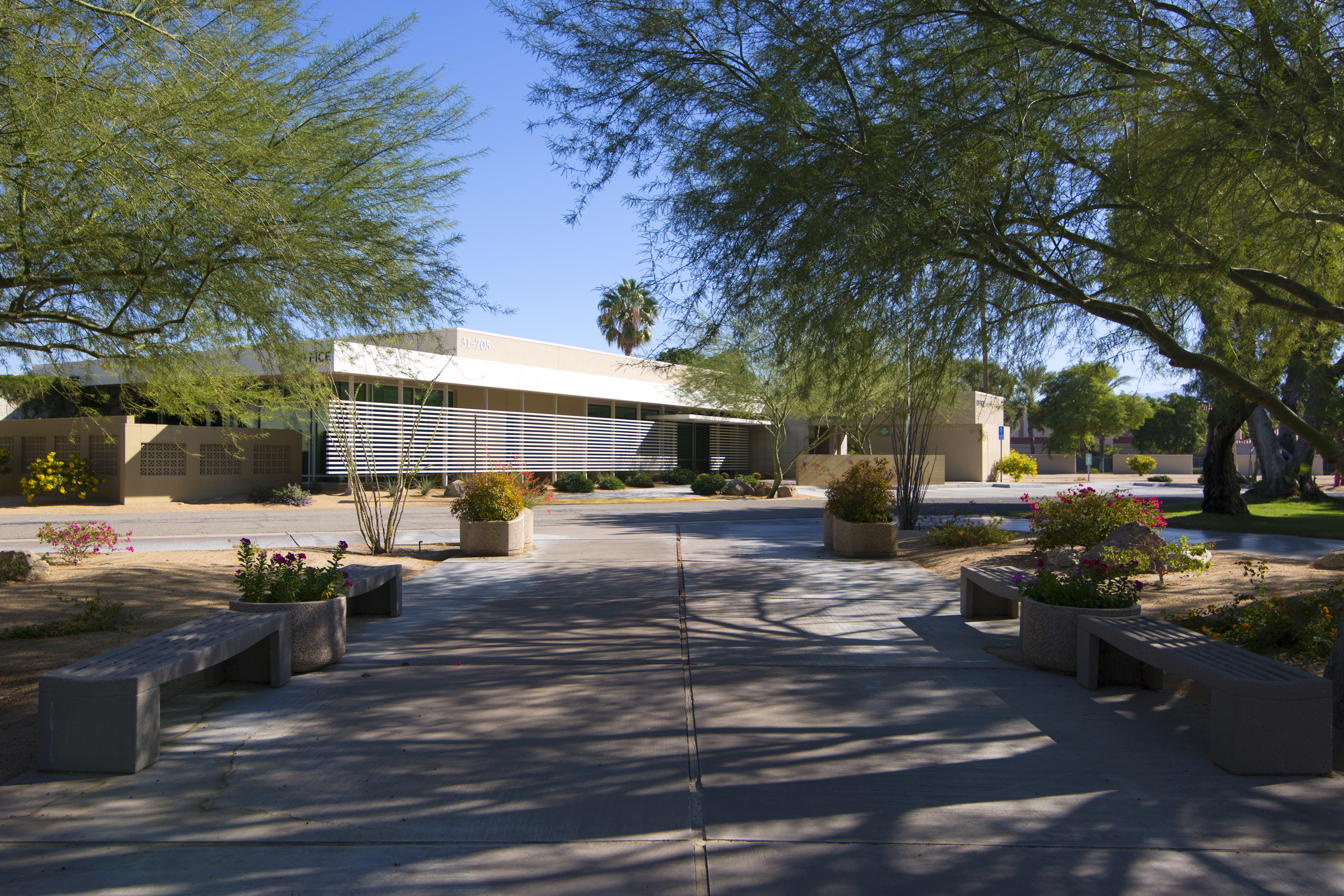
- Interactive map of Desert Memorial Park

Details
- Established: October 31, 1956; 69 years ago
- Location: Cathedral City, California
- Country: United States
- Coordinates: 33°49′04″N 116°26′34″W
- Type: Public
- Owned by: Palm Springs Cemetery District
- Website: Official Site
- Find a Grave: Desert Memorial Park
- The Political Graveyard: Desert Memorial Park

Desert Memorial Park is a cemetery in Cathedral City, California, United States, near Palm Springs. Opening in 1956 and receiving its first interment in 1957, it is maintained by the Palm Springs Cemetery District. The District also maintains the Welwood Murray Cemetery in Palm Springs.

== LGBTQ Veterans Memorial ==
In 2001, American Veterans Post 66 dedicated a memorial at the cemetery honoring all LGBTQ veterans. In 2018, the state passed California Assembly Bill 2439 designating the memorial as California's official LGBTQ veterans memorial. In recognition, a second plaque was affixed to the monument. The memorial is an obelisk of South Dakotan mahogany granite with the logo of American Veterans for Equal Rights on it.

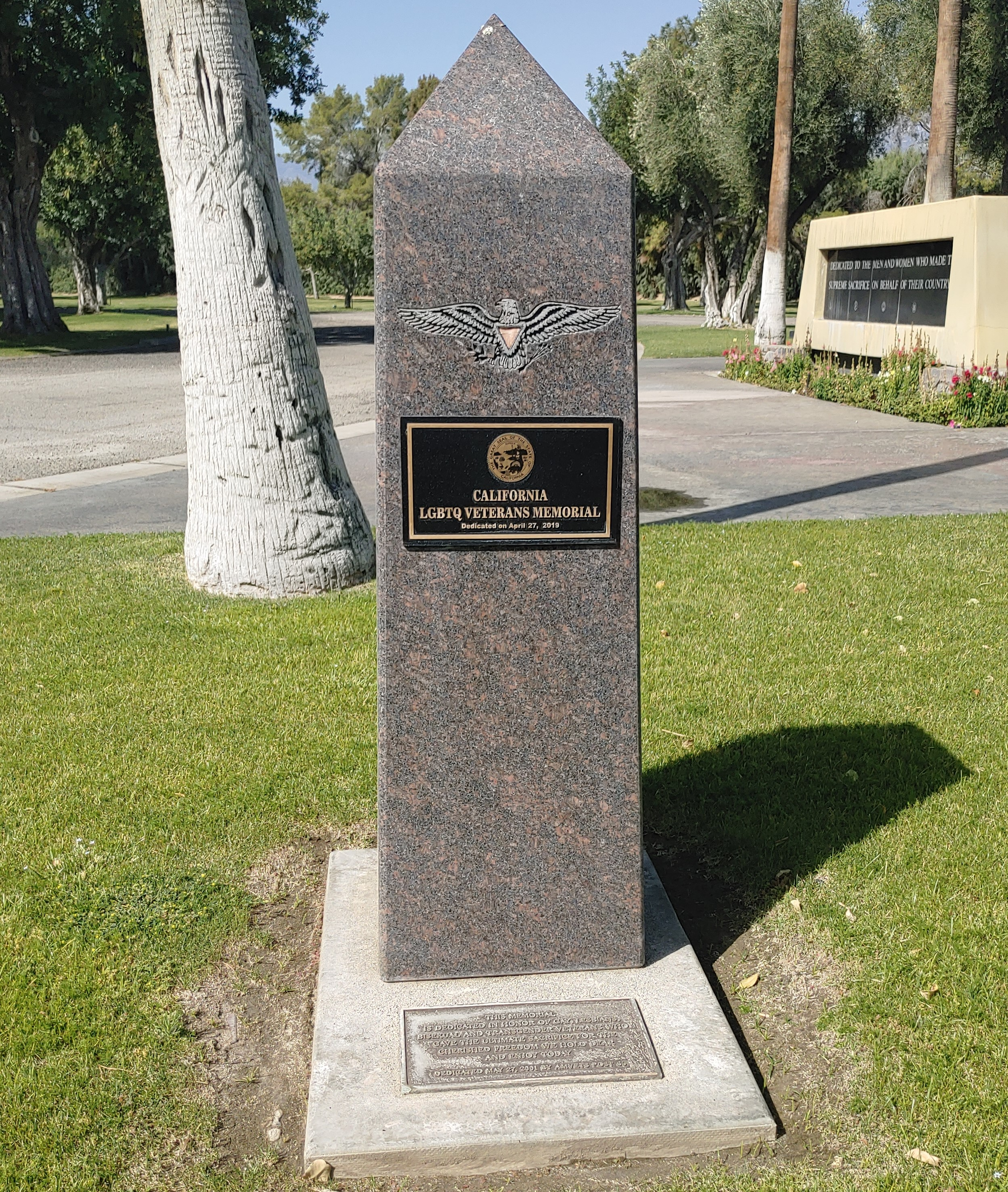
The California LGBTQ Veterans Memorial dedicated April 27, 2019, by the State of California

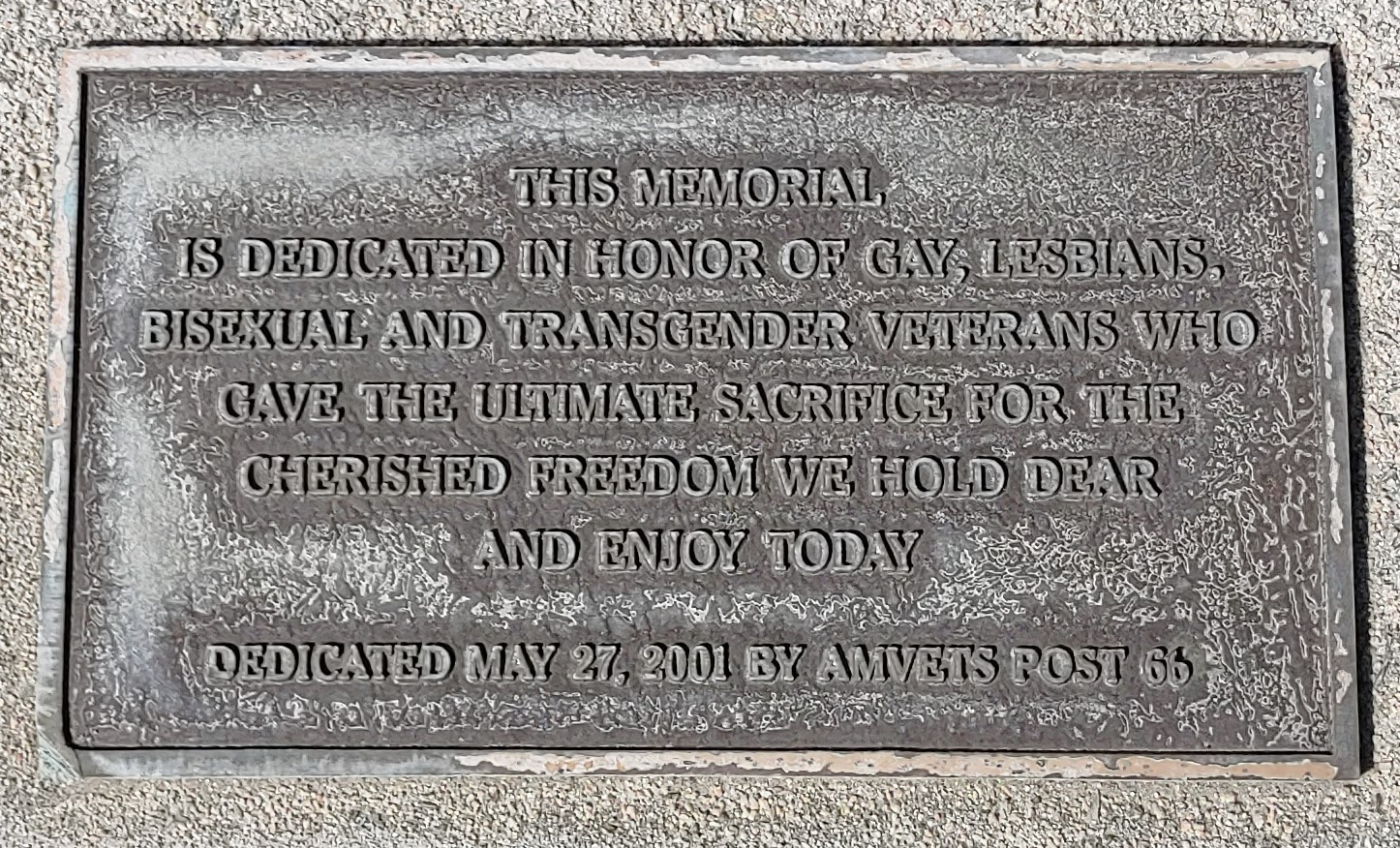
The original plaque below the California LGBTQ Veterans Memorial that was dedicated May 27, 2001, by AMVETS Post 66

== Notable interments ==
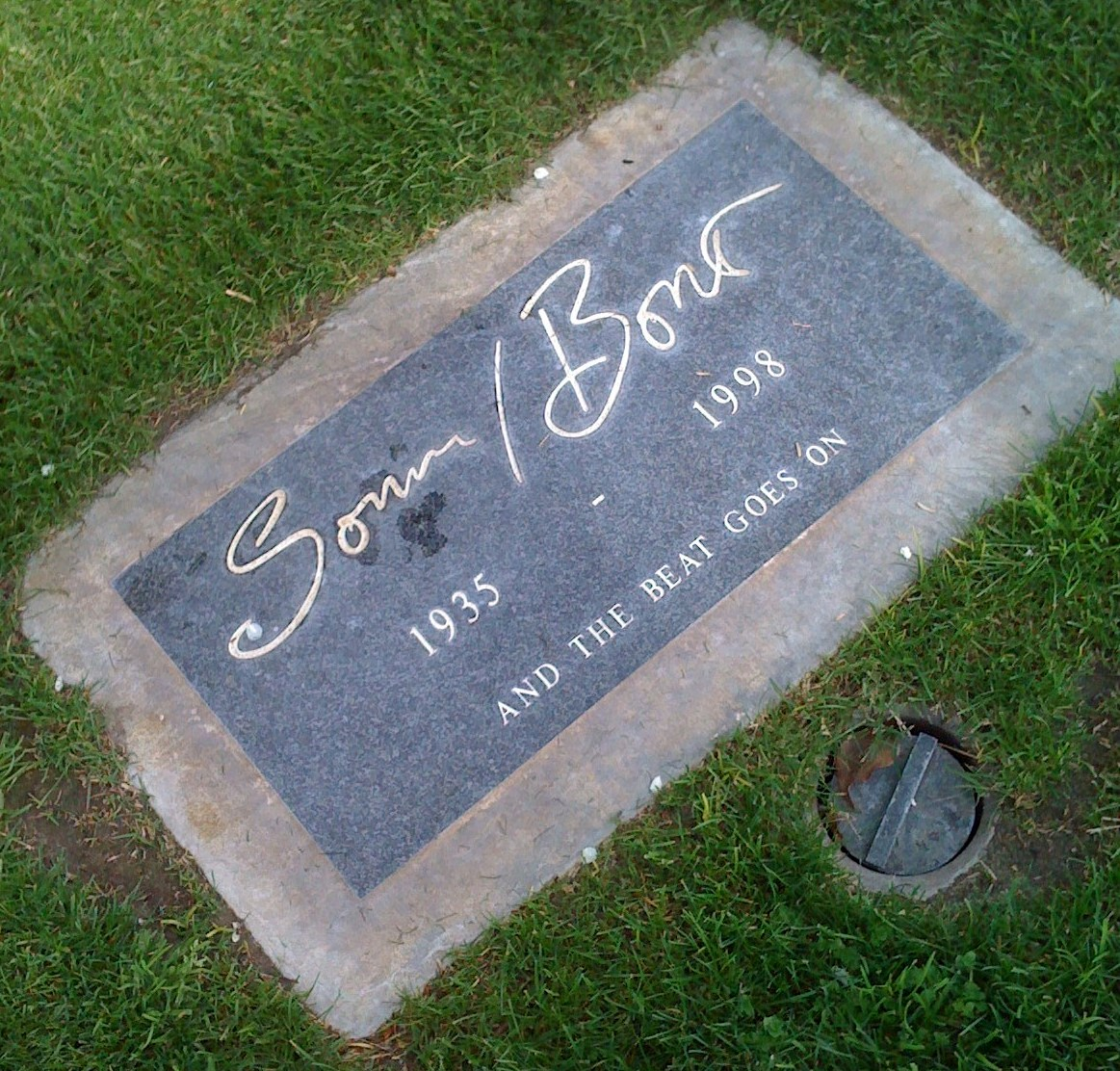
Grave of Sonny Bono

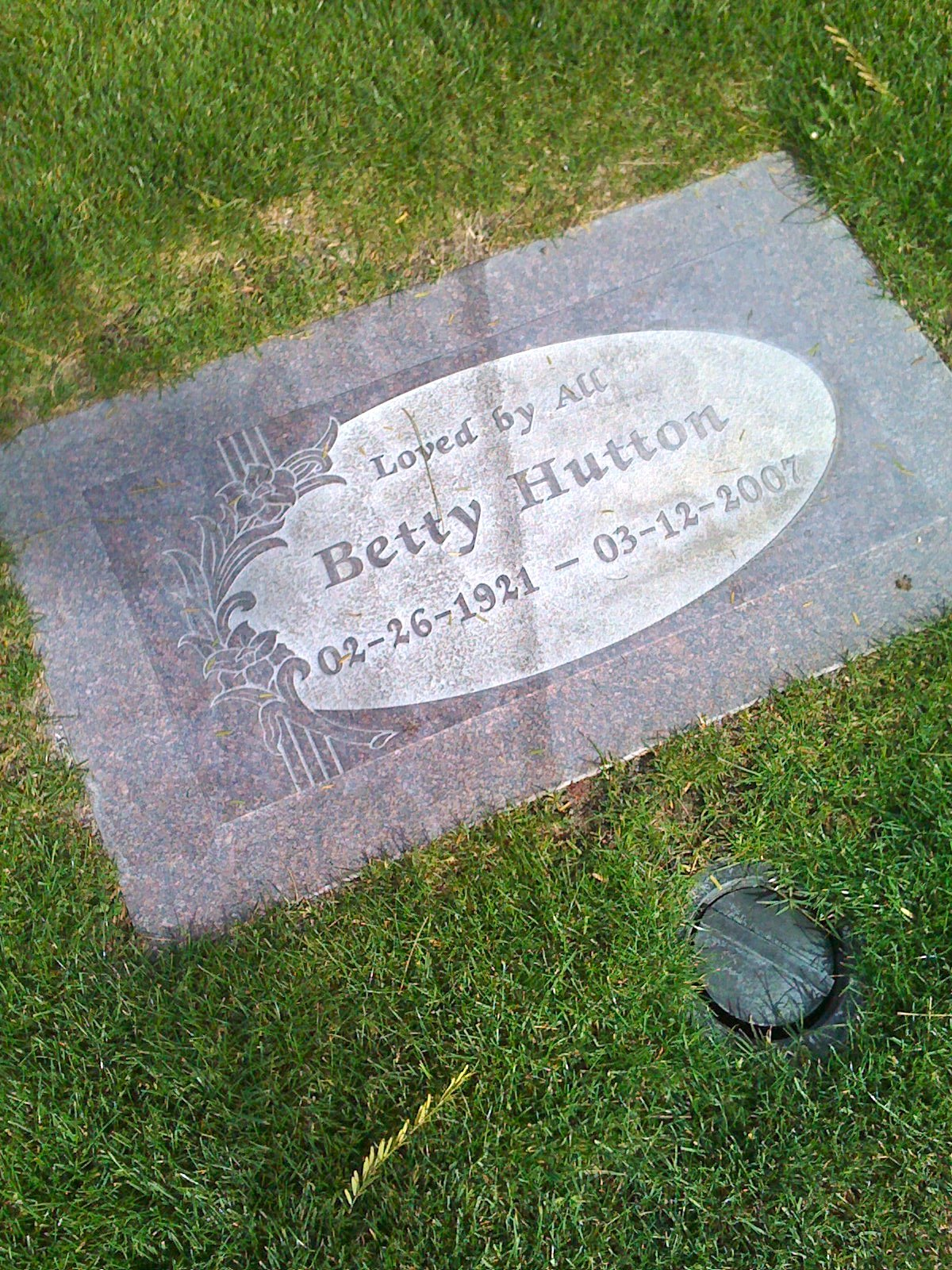
Grave of Betty Hutton

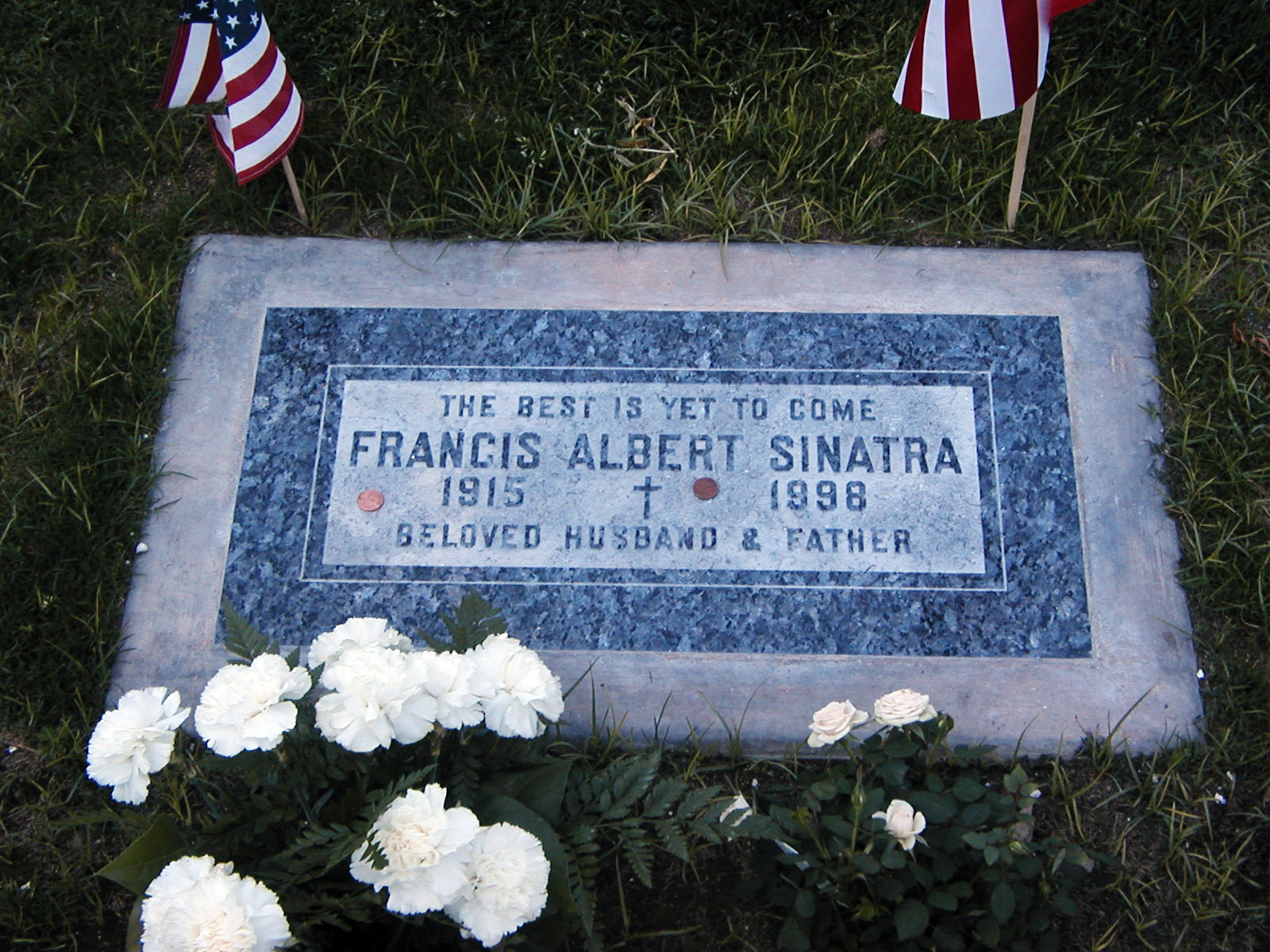
Grave of Frank Sinatra

Among those buried here are:

- Chris Alcaide (1923–2004), actor
- Dorothy Arnold (1917–1984), actress
- William Milton Asher (1921–2012), American television and film producer, director, and screenwriter
- Busby Berkeley (1895–1976), motion picture director and musical choreographer
- Sonny Bono (1935–1998, born Salvatore Phillip Bono), record producer, singer (one half of the husband-wife duo Sonny & Cher), actor, politician
- Lorayne Brox (1901–1993), one of the Brox Sisters singing group
- Bob Cobert (1924–2020), television music composer
- Lawrence Crossley (1899–1962), Palm Springs businessman, pioneer, and first black resident
- Velma Wayne Dawson (1912–2007), puppeteer and creator of Howdy Doody
- Brad Dexter (1917–2002), actor and film producer
- Alex Dreier (1916–2000), broadcaster and actor
- Jolie Gabor (1896–1997), mother of the Gabor sisters
- Magda Gabor (1915–1997), one of the Gabor sisters
- Louis Galen (1925–2007), philanthropist and banker
- Neva Gerber (1894–1974), silent film actress
- Bill Goodwin (1910–1958), television announcer
- Irving Green (1916–2006), founder of Mercury Records
- Earle Hagen (1919–2008), composer
- Claude Harmon (1916–1989), golfer
- Howard Hesseman (1940–2022), actor
- Josephine Hill (1899–1989), actress
- Roy W. Hill (1899–1986), philanthropist
- Eddy Howard (1915–1963), singer
- Betty Hutton (1921–2007), singer and actress
- Jennings Lang (1915–1996), film producer
- Andrea Leeds (1913–1984), actress
- Benjamin Lees (1924–2010), composer
- Diana "Mousie" Lewis (1919–1997), actress
- Monica Lewis (1922–2015), actress and singer
- Frederick Loewe (1901–1988), composer
- Marian Marsh (1913–2006), actress
- David J. McDonald (1902–1979), labor leader
- Maurice "Mac" McDonald (1902–1971), co-founder, with brother Dick, of the original McDonald's chain
- Cameron Mitchell (1918–1994), actor
- Hugo Mario Montenegro (1925–1981), orchestra leader and composer
- Chuck Negron (1942–2026), singer-songwriter
- John J. Phillips (1887–1983), United States Congressman
- William Powell (1892–1984), actor and associate producer
- William David Powell (1925–1968), TV writer
- Marjorie Rambeau (1889–1970), actress
- Rebel Randall (1921–2010, born Alaine C. Brandes), American actress
- Pete Reiser (1919–1981), baseball player
- Jilly Rizzo (1917–1992), restaurateur and entertainer
- Frank Scully (1892–1964) author, journalist, humorist, and columnist
- Ginny Simms (aka, Virginia E. Eastvold) (1913–1994), actress
- Anthony Martin Sinatra (1892–1969), professional boxer, bar owner and the father of Frank Sinatra
- Barbara Sinatra (1926–2017), model and showgirl, wife of Frank Sinatra
- Dolly Sinatra (1894–1977), mother of Frank Sinatra
- Frank Sinatra (1915–1998), singer and actor
- Suzanne Somers (1946–2023), actress
- Shirley Spork (1927–2022), golfer
- Herbert R. Temple Jr. (1928–2024), United States Army General
- Jimmy Van Heusen (1913–1990, born Edward C. Babcock), American composer
- Philip "Mickey" Weintraub (1907–1987), MLB player
- Demond Wilson (1946-2026), actor, author
- Ralph Young (1923–2008), singer and actor

== See also ==
- Coachella Valley Public Cemetery
- Forest Lawn Cemetery (Cathedral City) – across Ramon Road from Desert Memorial Park
- List of cemeteries in Riverside County, California
- List of cemeteries in California
