= Pioneer Memorial Cemetery (San Bernardino, California) =

Coordinates: 34.1133°N 117.2831°W

- Interactive map of Pioneer Memorial Cemetery

Details
- Established: April 1857
- Location: 211 East 9th Street, San Bernardino, California

Pioneer Memorial Cemetery in San Bernardino, San Bernardino County, California, is an extant burial place for the early settlers in the city. The cemetery was founded in April 1857. Remains of area pioneers previously interred at the unmarked Seccombe Lake Cemetery were relocated to the Pioneer Memorial Cemetery.

Operated by the City of San Bernardino, it is located at 211 East 9th Street.

== Notable burials ==
- Ellis Eames (1809–1882), first mayor of Provo, Utah from 1851 to 1852.
- Virginia Ann Cooksey Earp, mother of Wyatt, Virgil, Morgan, James, and Warren Earp.
- William F. Holcomb, prospector.
- O. M. Wozencraft (1814–1887), prominent early American settler in California.
