= Ellis Eames =

American politician (1809–1882)

Ellis Eames (alt. Ellis Ames, Ellis Eamut) (1809 – 1882) was an American politician. He served as the first mayor of Provo, Utah; he was mayor from 1851 to 1852.

== Early life ==
Eames was born in 1809, in Mentor, Ohio. He joined the Church of the Latter Day Saints in Jackson County, Missouri in 1834. He married Olive Jane Gibbs Eames (1815–1902), born February 13, 1815, in Rutland, Vermont. They married in about 1835. That same year, Eames took part in a mission along with Joseph Holbrook and Lyman Gibbs. The couple moved to Haun's Mill in 1837, where they were part of the group of Mormon families living near Haun's Mill in Livingston County, Missouri, site of the 1838, anti-Mormon Haun's Mill massacre. Eames' coat was said to have had a bullet hole shot through it during the massacre, but he, his wife Olive, and their four children all survived. While in the area, Eames partnered with Jacob Myers Jr. operating a grist mill upstream of Haun's Mill. A collection of his writings from that period was published as Reminiscence in Journal History of The Church of Jesus Christ of Latter-day Saints published October 30, 1838.

Eames later resided in Clay County, Missouri and Nauvoo, Illinois.

== Utah ==
Eames was initially part of Brigham Young's 1847 pioneer company, but due to illness was sent back to Winter Quarters, Nebraska. He subsequently arrived in Utah by 1849.

Ellis, Olive and their children were living in Utah in 1850, when Ellis married a second wife, Sarah Haskell, and was listed in the United States census as a "fiddler". He was mayor of Provo from 1851 to 1852.

== Later life and death ==
Eames moved to San Bernardino, California in 1854, where he became district attorney. When the Latter-day Saints there were called back to Utah Territory in 1857 due to the Utah War, Eames and Olive remained in San Bernardino, while Sarah and her children returned to Utah. Eames remained in contact with members of Brigham Young's army. Olive joined the Reorganization in 1864 with Ellis following in 1870.

In 1896, Olive wrote an account of the Haun's Mill Massacre that was published in the History of the Reorganized Church of Jesus Christ of Latter Day Saints. Eames died in 1882, and is buried at Pioneer Memorial Cemetery in San Bernardino. In 1954, a photo of Eames was discovered and added to Provo's gallery of mayors.
