= Cathedral City, California =

- City
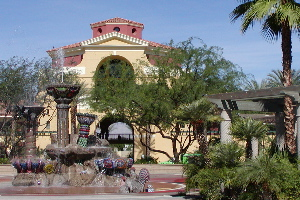
- Cathedral City Hall

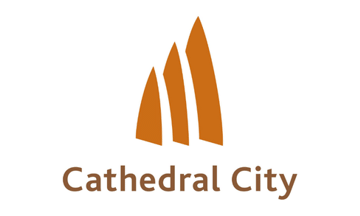
- Flag
- Nickname: Cat City
- Interactive map of Cathedral City, California
- Location in the United States
- Coordinates: 33°46′47″N 116°27′55″W
- Country: United States
- State: California
- County: Riverside
- Native American Reservation (partial): Agua Caliente Band of Cahuilla Indians
- Incorporated: November 16, 1981

Government
  - Type: Council–Manager
  - Mayor: Raymond Gregory
  - Mayor Pro Tem: Ernesto M. Gutierrez
  - City Council: Rita Lamb; Nancy Ross; Christina Gordon
  - City Manager: Charlie McClendon

Area
  - Total: 22.75 sq mi (58.93 km^{2})
  - Land: 22.49 sq mi (58.26 km^{2})
  - Water: 0.26 sq mi (0.67 km^{2}) 1.18%
- Elevation: 330 ft (100 m)

Population (2020)
  - Total: 51,493
  - Density: 2,289.2/sq mi (883.85/km^{2})
- Time zone: UTC-8 (Pacific)
  - Summer (DST): UTC-7 (PDT)
- ZIP codes: 92234–92235
- Area codes: 442/760
- FIPS code: 06-12048
- GNIS feature IDs: 1656454, 2409412
- Website: www.cathedralcity.gov

Cathedral City is a desert resort city in Riverside County, California, United States, within the Colorado Desert's Coachella Valley. Situated between Palm Springs and Rancho Mirage, the city has the second largest population, after Indio, of the nine cities in the Coachella Valley. Its population was 51,493 at the 2020 census, a slight increase from 51,200 at the 2010 census.

Prior to the arrival of European colonists, the land was part of the territory inhabited by the Cahuilla Indians. Today every other square mile of the city is part of the Agua Caliente Band of Cahuilla Indians reservation land. Development of a town began when a housing subdivision was built in 1925. It became an incorporated municipality in 1981.

The city's name is derived from Cathedral Canyon located to the south of the city in the foothills of the Santa Rosa and San Jacinto Mountains National Monument. The canyon is said to have received its name because certain rock formations in the canyon were reminiscent of a cathedral. A flood in August 1946 significantly altered the cathedral-like features of the canyon.

In the United Kingdom a population center needs to have city status, and a cathedral, in order to be called a cathedral city. This prompted Robert Ripley to include the town of Cathedral City in his December 9, 1939, Believe It Or Not column stating, "Believe it or not … there is no church in Cathedral City, Calif. It is named after a canyon".

== History ==
=== Early history: before 1860 ===
Cathedral City sits at the northwestern end of the Coachella Valley between the San Bernardino Mountains to the north, and the San Jacinto Mountains to the south, with the San Gorgonio Pass to the West. The earliest established inhabitants of this region were the Cahuilla Indians. They arrived in the area around 3,000 BCE. The Cahuilla were organized into bands of about 600 to 800 people, and it was the Agua Caliente Band of Cahuilla Indians who inhabited the lands that included what would become Cathedral City.

The land was claimed by Spain in 1768 when Spain established Las Californias, a province of the Viceroyalty of New Spain, and then by Mexico in 1821 when Mexico and Spain signed the Treaty of Cordoba. At that time the province had already been renamed and expanded into the larger Alta California province. After the Mexican–American War, and with the signing of the Treaty of Guadalupe Hidalgo in 1848, possession of the land was formally transferred to the United States, and it officially became part of the State of California when the state was formed in 1850.

In 1852 US Army Colonel Henry Washington, a nephew of President George Washington, was contracted by the government to survey Southern California. On November 7 of that year he established the initial point, in the San Bernardino Mountains, from which all subsequent surveys in Southern California would be based. In 1855 he was contracted to continue his work and survey the Coachella Valley. It was then that he found and named Cathedral Canyon for which Cathedral City would eventually be named.

Besides Colonel Henry Washington, there were occasional explorers, colonizers and soldiers that made their way through the area during the Spanish, Mexican, and early American eras, but none established any permanent structures or residences. The Cahuilla remained the only people known to be living in the area.

=== Stage and freight lines 1860 – early 20th century ===
Prior to the 1860s the only regularly traveled routes through the Coachella Valley were trading paths used by the Cahuilla and other Native American tribes. One of these paths, on the southwestern side of the valley, followed the base of the San Jacinto and Santa Rosa mountains somewhere near the Whitewater River, and would have passed through the area that would become Cathedral City. Early non-native explorers, surveyors, and military, such as Colonel Washington, made use of these routes, but regular transportation services were not established until 1862.

The Colorado River Gold Rush, which started in the spring of 1862, prompted William D. Bradshaw, a frontiersman, to seek a quicker route from Los Angeles to the Colorado River. Later that year he hired a guide, and with the help of the Cahuilla and Maricopa Indians, mapped a route from San Bernardino, California, through the San Gorgonio Pass and Coachella Valley, past the northern shore of the Salton Sink, through the passes between the Chuckwalla and Chocolate Mountains, and up to the Colorado River across from La Paz in the New Mexico Territory, (now the state of Arizona). Much of the route is thought to have followed the original southwestern trading path used by the Cahuilla.

Shortly after Bradshaw defined the trail from San Bernardino to La Paz, various stagecoach and freight companies began using the route. The stage and freight lines brought miners, supplies, and mail between San Bernardino and La Paz, and the route became known as the Bradshaw Trail or "Gold Road". The Bradshaw trail, like the original Cahuillian trail, passed through the future Cathedral City, but the nearest scheduled stops were Agua Caliente (now Palms Springs), and Indian Wells (now Indio). The stage and freight lines were eventually supplanted by the railroads, but the trail would later become the basis for Palm Canyon Drive and Highway 111 that run through the city today.

=== Depression era nightclubs ===
In 1931, Al and Lou Wertheimer of the reputed Detroit "Purple Gang" opened the Dunes Club just outside Palm Springs' city limits. This was followed in 1939 by Earl T. Sausser's 139 Club and the Cove Club in 1941, built by Jake Katelman and Frank Portnoy.

== Recent history ==
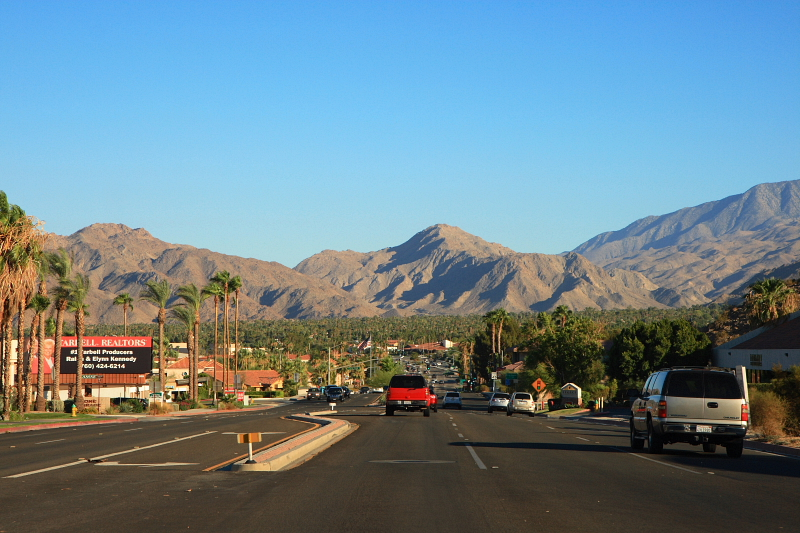
Cathedral City, on California State Route 111 near Palm Desert

Since incorporating as a city in 1981, Cathedral City has experienced substantial growth.

In 2002, a grassroots group suggested that Cathedral City merge with Palm Springs but the concept did not move forward.

The city launched a downtown revitalization program in the late 1990s, which was substantially completed by 2005. A new city hall was built, as well as the IMAX/Mary Pickford movie theater complex, along with a total of 130 acres (0.53 km^{2}) of new or remodeled stores and restaurant space.

In recent years, the city also built an outdoor amphitheater adjacent to the city hall area, and has hosted several annual festivals and events in that space. A new shopping center, Cathedral City Cove, broke ground in 2023.

== Geography ==
According to the United States Census Bureau, Cathedral City has a total area of 22.8 square miles (59 km^{2}), of which 21.5 square miles (56 km^{2}) of it is land and 0.3 square miles (0.78 km^{2}) of it (1.13%) is water.

Climate data for Cathedral City, California
Month	Jan	Feb	Mar	Apr	May	Jun	Jul	Aug	Sep	Oct	Nov	Dec	Year
Record high °F (°C)	98 (37)	105 (41)	108 (42)	110 (43)	118 (48)	121 (49)	122 (50)	121 (49)	121 (49)	110 (43)	98 (37)	93 (34)	122 (50)
Mean daily maximum °F (°C)	70.4 (21.3)	73.7 (23.2)	79.9 (26.6)	86.5 (30.3)	94.8 (34.9)	102.8 (39.3)	107.6 (42.0)	106.7 (41.5)	101.3 (38.5)	90.6 (32.6)	78.2 (25.7)	68.8 (20.4)	88.4 (31.3)
Mean daily minimum °F (°C)	45.4 (7.4)	48.0 (8.9)	53.0 (11.7)	58.1 (14.5)	65.3 (18.5)	71.8 (22.1)	78.1 (25.6)	78.2 (25.7)	72.6 (22.6)	62.6 (17.0)	51.8 (11.0)	44.2 (6.8)	60.8 (16.0)
Record low °F (°C)	18 (−8)	24 (−4)	29 (−2)	35 (2)	38 (3)	48 (9)	54 (12)	52 (11)	46 (8)	30 (−1)	26 (−3)	23 (−5)	18 (−8)
Average precipitation inches (mm)	1.15 (29)	1.02 (26)	0.58 (15)	0.08 (2.0)	0.06 (1.5)	0.05 (1.3)	0.17 (4.3)	0.38 (9.7)	0.39 (9.9)	0.12 (3.0)	0.28 (7.1)	0.57 (14)	4.85 (123)
Source 1:
Source 2:

== Demographics ==
Historical population
Census	Pop.	Note	%±
1960	1,855		—
1970	3,640		96.2%
1980	4,130		13.5%
1990	30,085		628.5%
2000	42,647		41.8%
2010	51,200		20.1%
2020	51,493		0.6%
U.S. Decennial Census

=== Racial and ethnic composition ===
Cathedral City, California – Racial and ethnic composition Note: the US Census treats Hispanic/Latino as an ethnic category. This table excludes Latinos from the racial categories and assigns them to a separate category. Hispanics/Latinos may be of any race.
Race / Ethnicity (NH = Non-Hispanic)	Pop 1980	Pop 1990	Pop 2000	Pop 2010	Pop 2020	% 1980	% 1990	% 2000	% 2010	% 2020
White alone (NH)	2,941	17,134	17,908	16,531	14,778	71.21%	56.95%	41.99%	32.29%	28.70%
Black or African American alone (NH)	25	618	1,049	1,108	1,108	0.61%	2.05%	2.46%	2.16%	2.15%
Native American or Alaska Native alone (NH)	14	155	231	228	268	0.34%	0.52%	0.54%	0.45%	0.52%
Asian alone (NH)	24	924	1,502	2,449	2,929	0.58%	3.07%	3.52%	4.78%	5.69%
Native Hawaiian or Pacific Islander alone (NH)	24	924	20	47	53	0.58%	3.07%	0.05%	0.09%	0.10%
Other race alone (NH)	10	57	39	69	250	0.24%	0.19%	0.09%	0.13%	0.49%
Mixed race or Multiracial (NH)	x	x	586	683	1,214	x	x	1.37%	1.33%	2.36%
Hispanic or Latino (any race)	1,116	11,197	21,312	30,085	30,893	27.02%	37.22%	49.97%	58.76%	60.00%
Total	4,130	30,085	42,647	51,200	51,493	100.00%	100.00%	100.00%	100.00%	100.00%

=== 2020 census ===
As of the 2020 census, Cathedral City had a population of 51,493. The population density was 2,289.2 inhabitants per square mile (883.9/km^{2}). The racial makeup of Cathedral City was 36.9% White, 2.4% African American, 1.9% Native American, 6.0% Asian, 0.1% Pacific Islander, 35.0% from other races, and 17.6% from two or more races. Hispanic or Latino of any race were 60.0% of the population.

The census reported that 99.2% of the population lived in households, 0.4% lived in non-institutionalized group quarters, and 0.3% were institutionalized. 100.0% of residents lived in urban areas, while 0.0% lived in rural areas.

There were 18,174 households, of which 31.9% included children under the age of 18. Of all households, 44.0% were married-couple households, 8.2% were cohabiting couple households, 25.9% had a female householder with no spouse or partner present, and 21.9% had a male householder with no spouse or partner present. About 26.6% of households were one person, and 15.8% were one person aged 65 or older. The average household size was 2.81. There were 11,928 families (65.6% of all households).

The age distribution was 21.6% under the age of 18, 9.0% aged 18 to 24, 23.3% aged 25 to 44, 27.2% aged 45 to 64, and 19.0% who were 65 years of age or older. The median age was 41.6 years. For every 100 females, there were 109.2 males, and for every 100 females age 18 and over there were 109.2 males.

There were 22,663 housing units at an average density of 1,007.5 units per square mile (389.0 units/km^{2}), of which 18,174 (80.2%) were occupied. Of occupied units, 62.8% were owner-occupied and 37.2% were occupied by renters. The homeowner vacancy rate was 1.7%, and the rental vacancy rate was 5.8%.

=== 2010 census ===
The 2010 United States census reported that Cathedral City had a population of 51,200. The population density was 2,353.3 inhabitants per square mile (908.6/km^{2}). The racial makeup of Cathedral City was 32,537 (63.5%) White (32.3% Non-Hispanic White), 1,344 (2.6%) African American, 540 (1.1%) Native American, 2,562 (5.0%) Asian, 55 (0.1%) Pacific Islander, 12,008 (23.5%) from other races, and 2,154 (4.2%) from two or more races. Hispanic or Latino of any race were 30,085 persons (58.8%).

The Census reported that 50,905 people (99.4% of the population) lived in households, 263 (0.5%) lived in non-institutionalized group quarters, and 32 (0.1%) were institutionalized.

There were 17,047 households, out of which 6,574 (38.6%) had children under the age of 18 living in them, 7,589 (44.5%) were opposite-sex married couples living together, 2,291 (13.4%) had a female householder with no husband present, 1,176 (6.9%) had a male householder with no wife present. There were 1,054 (6.2%) unmarried opposite-sex partnerships, and 779 (4.6%) same-sex married couples or partnerships. 4,292 households (25.2%) were made up of individuals, and 2,259 (13.3%) had someone living alone who was 65 years of age or older. The average household size was 2.99. There were 11,056 families (64.9% of all households); the average family size was 3.67.

The population was spread out, with 13,856 people (27.1%) under the age of 18, 4,906 people (9.6%) aged 18 to 24, 12,948 people (25.3%) aged 25 to 44, 12,127 people (23.7%) aged 45 to 64, and 7,363 people (14.4%) who were 65 years of age or older. The median age was 36.0 years. For every 100 females, there were 105.9 males. For every 100 females age 18 and over, there were 107.2 males.

There were 20,995 housing units at an average density of 965.0 units per square mile (372.6 units/km^{2}), of which 10,769 (63.2%) were owner-occupied, and 6,278 (36.8%) were occupied by renters. The homeowner vacancy rate was 4.2%; the rental vacancy rate was 11.0%. 30,236 people (59.1% of the population) lived in owner-occupied housing units and 20,669 people (40.4%) lived in rental housing units.

=== Income and poverty ===
During 2009–2013, Cathedral City had a median household income of $44,406, with 20.5% of the population living below the federal poverty line.

In 2023, the U.S. Census Bureau estimated that the median household income was $67,031, and the per capita income was $34,922. About 9.9% of families and 15.3% of the population were below the poverty line.

== Economy ==
=== Cathedral City Auto Center ===
The Cathedral City Auto Center, situated along the Highway 111 commercial corridor, is a major automotive regional center in the Coachella Valley. The center features 9 dealerships representing 16 manufacturers.

A cornerstone of the center is Jessup Auto Plaza, a family-owned dealership founded in 1938. Originally opened as Plaza Motors, it is one of the oldest continuously operating automotive businesses in the region and moved to its current 13-acre Cathedral City campus in 2001.

== Parks and recreation ==
Date Palm Country Club and golf course, designed in 1967 and opened in 1971, has an 18-hole "executive style" facility designed by Ted Robinson, ASCCA. It features 3,100 yards (2,800 m) of golf from the longest tees for a par of 58. The course rating is 54.9/57.2 and it has a slope rating of 90/93. It is landscaped in Bermuda Greens and includes lakes and sand traps. It includes the 175 yard 8th hole, which has an accurate tee shot over a lake. The Phil Harris Golf Classic was held there for many years from the 1940s to until the death of Phil Harris in 1994. The country club is built on land leased from the Agua Caliente Indian Reservation, and includes a retirement community of manufactured homes that line the greens.

The Big League Dreams Sports Park softball complex is on the corner of Date Palm and Dinah Shore drives, made up of four softball fields designed as replicas of four major league ballparks. The Pepsi All-Star Softball Game has been held there since 1998. The Cathedral City Soccer Park, next to James Workman Middle School, is where the So Cal Coyotes minor league football team play their games (and also in the Rancho Mirage High School stadium). In 2018–19, the So Cal Coyotes changed leagues and now play in Indio, California in the Shadow Hills High School football stadium.

The nine parks in Cathedral City are:

- Century Park
- Dog Park
- Dennis Keat Soccer Park
- Memorial Park
- Ocotillo Park
- Panorama Park
- Patriot Park
- Second Street Park
- Town Square

An additional park is proposed at Corta Road and Landau Boulevard.

=== Golf ===
Several local golf resorts are in Cathedral City. These include Lawrence Welk's Desert Oasis Hotel/resort located in the Cathedral Canyon Country Club, the Date Palm Country Club, Outdoor Resort – Palm Springs, Cimarron Golf Resort, and the Desert Princess Palm Springs Resort and Golf Club.

== Government ==
=== County ===
Cathedral City is in Supervisorial District 4 of Riverside County, represented by Democrat V. Manuel Perez.

=== State ===
In the California State Legislature, Cathedral City is in the 19th senatorial district, represented by Republican Rosilicie Ochoa Bogh, and in the 47th Assembly district, represented by Republican Greg Wallis.

=== Federal ===
In the United States House of Representatives, Cathedral City is in California's 25th congressional district, represented by Democrat Raul Ruiz.

=== Tribal Council ===
The tribal council of the Agua Caliente Band of Cahuilla Indians governs over parts of the city where reservation jurisdictions overlap.

== Education ==
Cathedral City High School, opened in 1991, is a major educational and recreational center to the city. The varsity football, basketball and soccer teams had earned CIF-southern California championship runs in the late 1990s and 2000s. Cathedral City is also home to Mayfield College, a private college that offers career training in health care, HVAC, technology, and business.

== Notable people ==
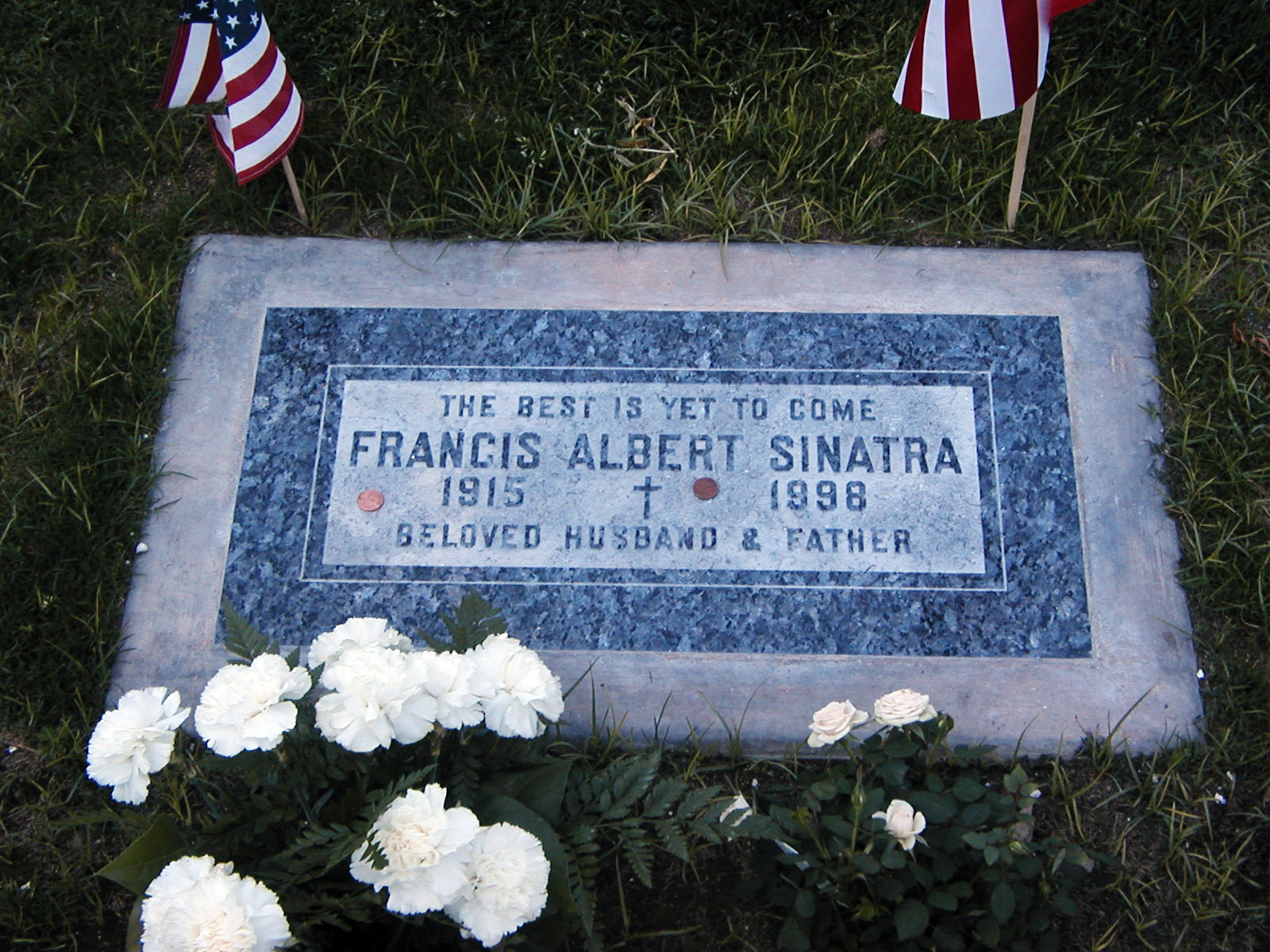
Frank Sinatra's grave at Desert Memorial Park in Cathedral City

The city was a winter residence for actors Robert Duvall and Martin Landau in the 1960s, and TV show host Monty Hall in the 1990s. Frank Sinatra's grave is located in Desert Memorial Park cemetery, as are those of several other prominent figures, including actor William Powell, singer-songwriter Sonny Bono, former mayor of Palm Springs, and actress Jane Wyman.

Other notable residents include:

- Timothy Bradley (born 1983), a former WBO welterweight champion, is from Cathedral City and graduated from Cathedral City High School.
- Lalo Guerrero (1916–2005), a Chicano folk musician, lived in Cathedral City in his final years.
- John Michael Meehan (1959–2016), a nurse anesthetist and conman whose life story was adapted into the Dirty John podcast, lived in a trailer, on his sister Donna Meehan Stewart's RV lot in Cathedral City, before marrying Debra Newell.
- Simon Oakland (1915–1983), an American actor, died in the town on August 29, 1983, a day after the actor's 68th birthday.
- Agnes Lawrence Pelton (1881–1961), was a German-born modernist painter, who was particularly known for portraits of Native American Pueblo peoples, desert landscapes and still life paintings, spent the last 29 year of her life in Cathedral City. F Street was renamed Agnes Pelton Way in her honor.
- Willard Price (1887–1983), a Canadian-American writer, lived in Cathedral City from 1940 until 1973, during which he wrote most of his Adventure series of children's novels.

== See also ==
- Cahuilla
- Coachella Valley
- Riverside County, California
- List of Riverside County, California, placename etymologies
