= SunLine Transit Agency =

Bus agency in Riverside County, California

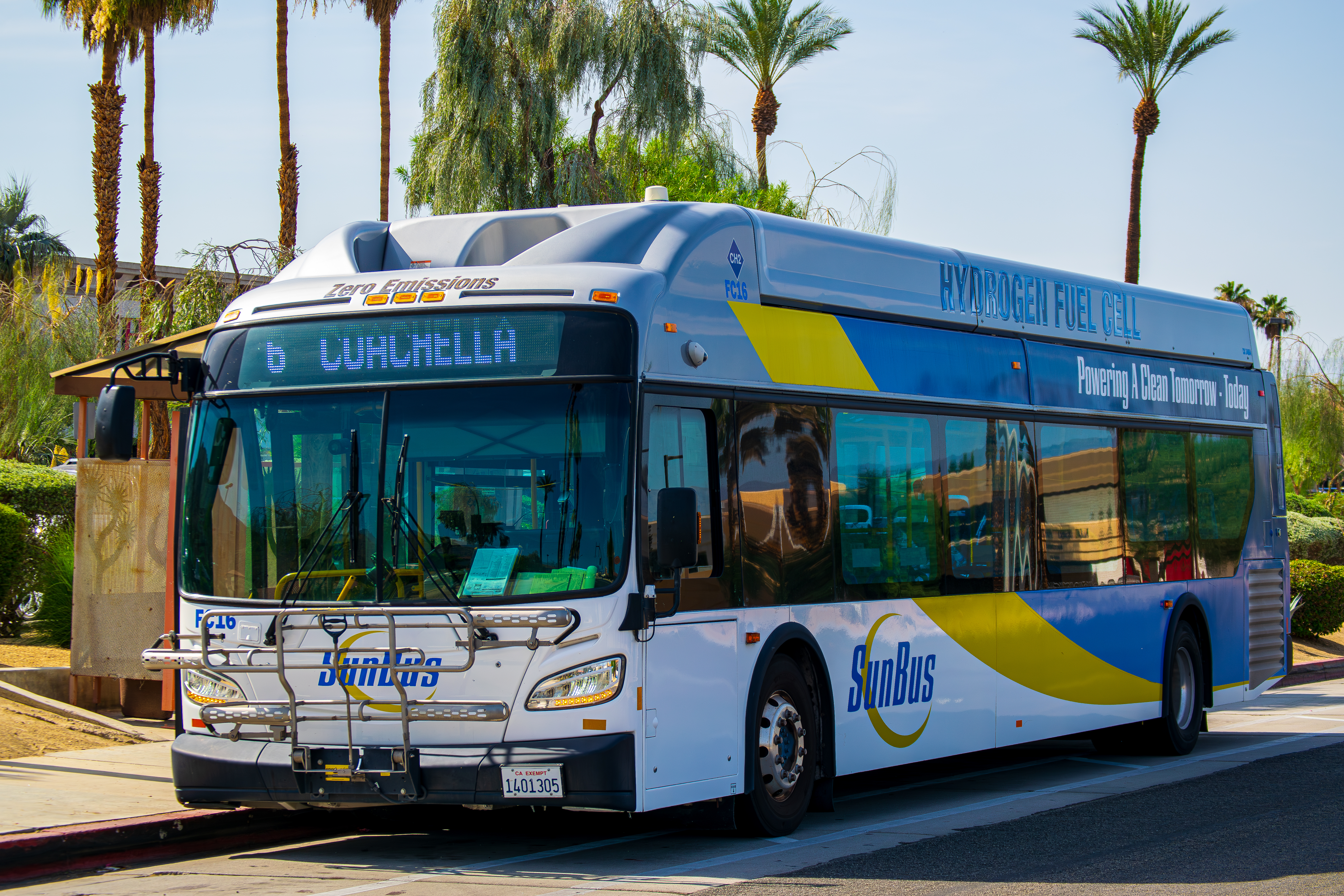
- SunLine New Flyer XHE40 hydrogen fuel cell bus
- Founded: July 1, 1977; 48 years ago
- Headquarters: 32-505 Harry Oliver Trail; Thousand Palms, California
- Service type: bus service, paratransit
- Routes: 10
- Fleet: 68 buses, 27 paratransit
- Daily ridership: 8,700 (weekdays, Q4 2025)
- Annual ridership: 2,742,300 (2025)
- Website: sunline.org

SunLine Transit Agency is a transit operator in Riverside County, California, United States, providing bus service to more than 3.5 million passengers per year in the Palm Springs Area. Service extends into San Bernardino Transit Center during peak hours. In 2025, the system had a ridership of 2,742,300, or about 8,700 per weekday as of the fourth quarter of 2025.

== History and description ==
SunLine Transit Agency (STA) was established under a Joint Powers Agreement, initially between Riverside County and Coachella Valley cities (Coachella, Desert Hot Springs, Indio, Palm Desert, and Palm Springs) on July 1, 1977. Cathedral City, Indian Wells, La Quinta, and Rancho Mirage were added later. Each of the nine member cities selects one member of the SunLine Board of Directors, with the tenth provided by Riverside County.

The service area covers 1,120 mi^{2} (2,900 km^{2}), bounded approximately by the San Gorgonio Pass on the west and the Salton Sea on the southeast. In addition to its transit operations, SunLine regulates local taxi services (as the SunLine Regulatory Administration, a division of the SunLine Services Group) and sells CNG and hydrogen to the public from dispensers at its Thousand Palms and Indio operations facilities, under the brand SunFuels.

== Routes ==
=== Local routes ===
Route	Terminals		Via	Notes
1EV	Coachella 5th Street, Vine Avenue	Palm Desert Town Center Way, Hahn Road	SR 111	
1WV	Palm Springs Palm Canyon Drive, Stevens Road	Palm Desert Town Center Way, Hahn Road	SR 111	
2	Cathedral City B Street, Buddy Rogers Avenue	Desert Hot Springs West Drive, Pierson Boulevard	Ramon Road, Gene Autry Trail	Serves Palm Springs International Airport
3	Desert Hot Springs West Drive, Pierson Boulevard	Desert Edge Dillon Road, Corkill Road	Hacienda Avenue	
4	Palm Springs El Cielo Road and Kirk Douglas Way	Palm Desert Town Center Way, Hahn Road	Vista Chino, Bob Hope Drive	
5	Palm Desert Town Center Way, Hahn Road	Desert Hot Springs West Drive, Pierson Boulevard	I-10	
6	Palm Desert Town Center Way, Hahn Road	Coachella 5th Street, Vine Avenue	Fred Waring Drive	
7	La Quinta Calle Madrid & Avenida Vallejo	Palm Desert Harris Lane, Washington Street	Washington Street	
8	Mecca 66th Avenue, Date Palm Street	Indio Showcase Parkway, Monroe Street	SR 86, Jackson Street	
9	Mecca 66th Avenue, Date Palm Street	North Shore Club View Drive, Windlass Drive	70th Street	
10 Commuter Link	Indio Highway 111, Golf Center Parkway	San Bernardino San Bernardino Transit Center	I-10, SR 210	Serves Cal State San Bernardino

=== School Tripper routes ===
Services operate weekdays only.

Route	Terminals		Via	Notes
200	Desert Hot Springs West Drive, Pierson Boulevard		Gene Autry Trail	To Palm Springs High School
500	Palm Desert Cook Street, University Park Drive		Cook Street	To The Shops At Palm Desert
700	La Quinta Calle Madrid & Avenida Vallejo	Palm Desert Harris Lane, Washington Street	Washington Street	
701	La Quinta Calle Madrid, Avenida Vallejo		Washington Street	To Harris Lane and Washington Street
800	Indio Highway 111, Golf Center Parkway		Jackson Street	To Shadow Hills High School
801	Indio Shadow Hills High School		Madison Street	To Jackson Street and Avenue 44
802	Indio Shadow Hills High School		Jackson Street	To Highway 111 and Golf Center Parkway
803	Indio Avenue 44, Jefferson Street		Madison Street	To Shadow Hills High School

=== Destinations ===
Destinations served include:

- Agua Caliente Casino
- Agua Caliente Cultural Museum
- National Date Festival Fairgrounds
- Indian Wells Tennis Garden
- Palm Springs Air Museum
- Indio High School
- La Quinta High School
- Palm Desert High School
- Palm Springs High School
- Cathedral City High School
- Rancho Mirage High School
- Desert Memorial Park
- Eisenhower Medical Center
- Westfield Palm Desert
- McCallum Theater
- College of the Desert
- Palm Springs Aerial Tramway
- California State University, San Bernardino
- San Bernardino Transit Center

== Governance ==
SunLine is governed by a board of directors with 10 members

- 1 City Council member From Palm Springs
- 1 City Council member from the 9 cities in the Palm Springs Area that are not Palm Springs City.
- 1 from the Riverside County Board of Supervisors, that represents the Palm Springs Area (District 4)

Chair

Nancy Ross

Vice Chair

Lynn Mallotto

Chief Executive Officer

Mona Babauta

== Facilities and bus fleet ==
Early fuel cell buses

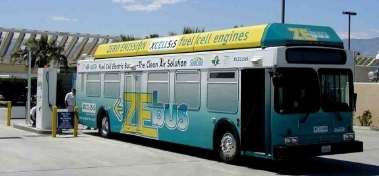
XCELLSiS ZEbus refueling at Thousand Palms facility

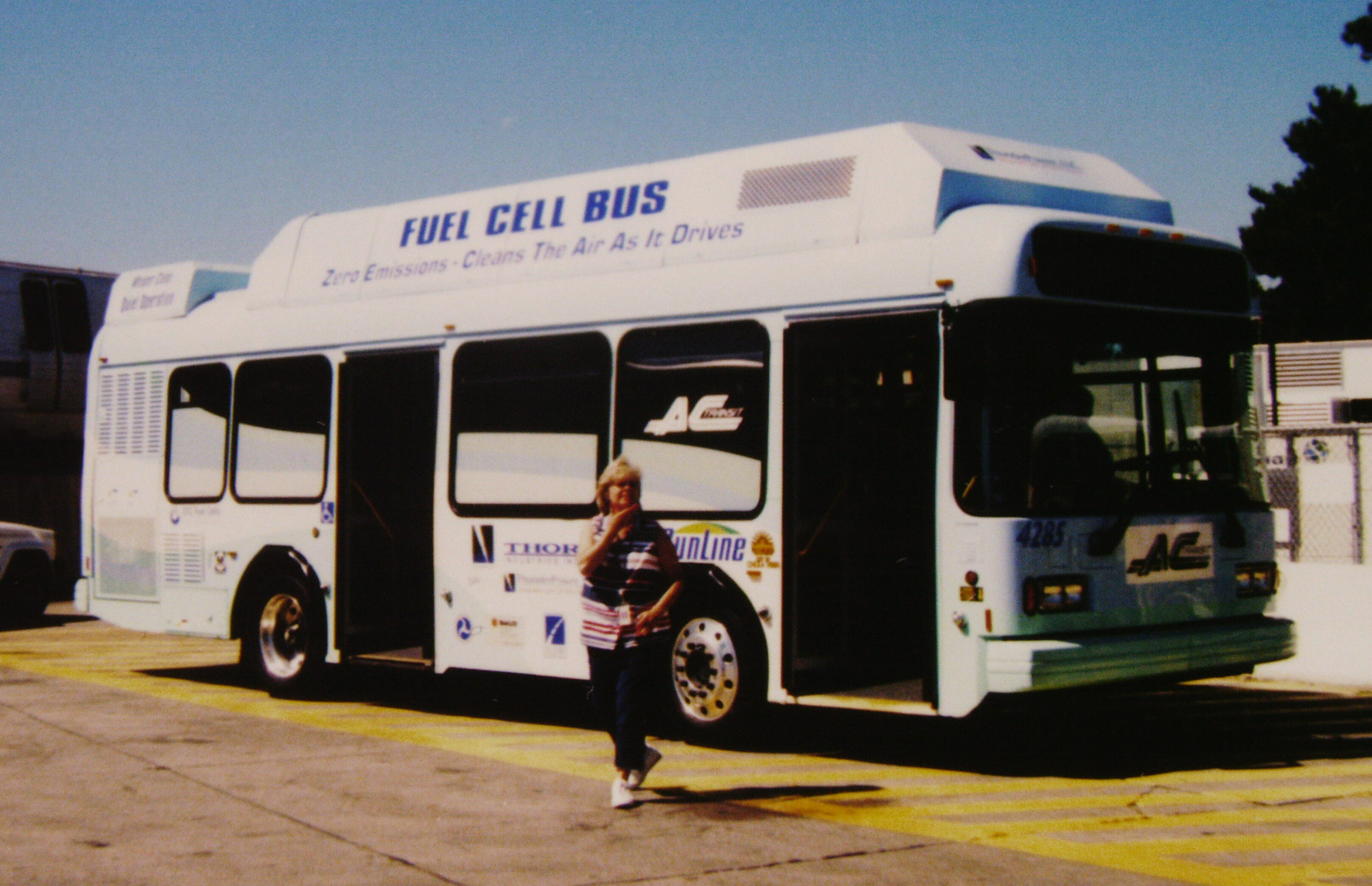
Thor/ISE ThunderPower in service with AC Transit after initial operations with SunLine

The initial fleet included 22 buses in 1977. SunDial paratransit operations started in 1991. The SunLine Board of Directors adopted a resolution in 1992 to convert their fleet to alternative fuel, and became the first transit agency in the United States to do so in 1994, using compressed natural gas (CNG) buses.

Starting in 2000, SunLine began limited operations with hydrogen fuel cell buses, installing a hydrogen fuel station using a Stuart Energy electrolyzer to supply the XCELLSiS ZEbus for a 13-month trial. The first revenue operations were conducted with the Thor/ISE ThunderPower fuel cell bus, using an ElDorado National EZ-Rider II chassis, between November 2002 to February 2003. By that time, SunLine also had installed a HyRadix methane reformer to generate hydrogen. SunLine tested a hydrogen hybrid internal combustion engine (HHICE) bus in early 2005; the bus was subsequently sent to Winnipeg Transit for cold weather testing.

STA plans to convert their fleet to zero-emission buses (ZEB) by 2035, with only ZEBs purchased starting in 2021. Due to the relatively long fixed routes, the final mix of ZEBs is expected to be mostly hydrogen fuel-cell buses.

=== Active fleet ===
Make/Model	Fleet numbers	Thumbnail	Year	Engine	Transmission	Notes
New Flyer C40LF	575-594	2008 C40LF 594	2007	Cummins Westport ISL G EPA07	ZF 5HP594C	
New Flyer C40LF	601-621		2008	Cummins Westport ISL G EPA07	ZF 5HP594C	
New Flyer XN40	622-627	2016 XN40 623	2016	Cummins Westport ISL G EPA13	ZF 6AP1400B	
New Flyer XN40	628-637	2020 XN40 630	2020	Cummins Westport L9N EPA17	ZF 6AP1420B	
Gillig BRT CNG 40'	638-652	Ex RTA Sunline Gillig BRT CNG 647	2013	Cummins Westport ISL G EPA13	Allison B400R	
BYD K9M	811–814	2019 BYD K9M on Route 5	2019	2 x TYC-150A 150 kW (max) permanent magnet motor	600 Ah Lithium iron phosphate batteries	
MCI D4500CT CNG	2007–2008	2008 on the 10 to San Bernardino Transit Center approaching San Bernardino Transit Center	2020	Cummins Westport ISX12N EPA17	Allison B500R	Used only on Route 10 Commuter Link
MCI D4500CT CNG	2010	MCI D4500CT 2010	2023	Cummins Westport ISX12N EPA21	Allison B500R	Used only on Route 10 Commuter Link
ENC Axess BRT FC 40'	FC8-FC12	El Dorado FC FC12	2018	Ballard FCvelocity HD6 150 kW	BAE Systems Hybridrive	
New Flyer XHE40	FC14-FC18	2018 XHE40 FC16	2018	Ballard FCvelocity HD85	Siemens ELFA2	
ENC Axess BRT FC 40'	FC19		2015	Ballard FCvelocity HD6 150 kW	BAE Systems Hybridrive	* Ex Orange County Transportation Authority 1101, Acquired in May 2022.
New Flyer XHE40	FC20-FC24	2021 XHE40 FC22 on Route 1EV	2021	Ballard FCvelocity HD85	Siemens ELFA2	
New Flyer XHE40	FC25-FC29	2022 XHE40 FC25	2022	Ballard FCvelocity HD85	Siemens ELFA2	
New Flyer XHE40	FC30-FC37	2024 XHE40 FC30 on Route 1EV	2024	Ballard FCMove-HD+	Siemens ELFA3	

SunLine has two operations and maintenance facilities: one (including the administrative offices) in Thousand Palms, and another in Indio. As of 2021, on-site refueling and charging capabilities include an electrolyzer that can produce 900 kg/d (2,000 lb/d) of hydrogen at Thousand Palms, which came online in 2019, and six 80 kW AC/DC battery-electric bus chargers, three each at both Thousand Palms and Indio. Hydrogen dispensers (using delivered liquid H_{2}) and additional chargers are planned for both facilities.

Hydrogen production started in November 2000. Two electrolyzers and a natural gas reformer were part of the initial installation. One electrolyzer, supplied by Teledyne Brown, generated 40 ft^{3} (1.1 m^{3}) per hour using 7.5 kW of electricity, supplied by solar panels; the other electrolyzer, supplied by Stuart Energy, produced 1,400 ft^{3} (40 m^{3}) per hour. The reformer produced 4,200 ft^{3} (120 m^{3}) per hour. The HyRadix Adéo reformer was installed at the end of 2003.
