= Desert Empire League =

American high school sports league

The Desert Empire League is an American high school sports league in the Coachella Valley of Riverside County, California affiliated with the CIF Southern Section. It was formed for the 2019 season from schools originally in the Desert Valley League and the defunct De Anza League.

Teams in the league include:

- La Quinta High School Blackhawks
- Palm Desert High School Aztecs
- Palm Springs High School Indians
- Rancho Mirage High School Rattlers
- Shadow Hills High School Knights
- Xavier College Preparatory High School Saints
