= Shadow Hills High School =

Location
- 39-225 Jefferson Street; Indio, California 92203; United States; 33°45′44″N 116°16′13″W

Information
- Type: Public high school
- Established: 2009; 17 years ago
- Principal: David Dunn
- Teaching staff: 71.75 (FTE)
- Enrollment: 1,702 (2023-2024)
- Student to teacher ratio: 23.72
- Color
- Mascot: Knights
- Website: shhs.dsusd.us

Shadow Hills High School is a public high school for grades 9–12. It is located in north Indio, California, United States.

Other high schools in the area are Indio High School, La Quinta High School and Palm Desert High School. The main feeder school are Indio Middle School and Desert Ridge Academy which replaced the former Woodrow Wilson Middle School in 2009.

== History ==
Shadow Hills High School opened on August 31, 2009, with about 600 freshman and sophomore students. The high school is the fourth in the Desert Sands Unified School District. Currently Shadow Hills has about 1,700 students currently enrolled with about 85.2% of students being Hispanic or Latino. Additionally, according to the 2023-2024 School Accountability Report Card for Shadow Hills, 78.10% of students are socioeconomically disadvantaged and 13.8% of students are students with disabilities.

Shadow Hills has 84 classrooms, a 450-seat performing arts theater, an 80-seat lecture hall, a football stadium, a swimming pool, and a three-court gymnasium.

In July 2012, Marcus Wood, the former principal of John Glenn Middle School in Desert Sands Unified, succeeded the recently retired Doug Bluth as the school's second principal.

One year after earning his Ed.D., Dr. Wood was promoted to Senior Director of Curriculum, Instruction, and Assessment at the district office. Former SHHS Assistant Principal Gabriel P. Fajardo was hired before the 2017/2018 school year to fill the vacant principal position. Currently, the principal of Shadow Hills High School is Dr. David Dunn who became principal in 2022.

Shadow Hills High School athletics compete in the Desert Empire League.

== Performing arts ==
The Regiment of the Realm, the Shadow Hills High School marching band, first received global recognition after having participated at the Coachella Valley Music and Arts Festival on April 13 and 20 alongside the group Big Gigantic. With 34 local marching band students, the Regiment of the Realm performed a remix of "Can't Hold Us" and "I Need A Dollar" with Big Gigantic and gained local fame for their performance at one of the biggest music festivals in the world.

In 2015, the Regiment of the Realm was featured in the One Direction music video for "Steal My Girl". On September 30, 40 band members were driven to a local national park in Southern California, where the music video was filmed in the morning until early evening.

Recently, the Regiment was recruited to perform live on the set of composer Lisa Bielawa's new series titled Vireo: The Spiritual Biography of a Witch's Accuser, an episodic opera featured on KCET.

Royal Voices in Harmony, the school's choir program, is directed by Kaylon Mcgee. The program consists of 3 choirs: mixed choir, which is open to any students with no audition, Bella Voce, a women's ensemble available for 10–12 graders with a required audition, and Chamber Singers, a choir for 10–12 graders with a required audition. The Chambers and Bellas have participated in many competitions at places like Disneyland and Carnegie Hall. The choirs recently both placed at the Form music festival in Anaheim, California. The Chamber Singers placed third and the Bella Voce placed second, landing them both a Gold rating, meaning they are both invited back for the judges invitational next year.

== Athletics ==
Although a young school, Shadow Hills has enjoyed much success in athletics. Upon its opening Shadow Hills competed in the Desert Valley League, before moving to the Desert Empire League. Shadow Hills is part of the CIF-SS (California Interscholastic Federation-Southern Section), which covers most of Southern California, with each team playing in their perspective divisions. The most recent success has come from the Shadow Hills Girls Wrestling Program in which the team won a Northern Division CIF-SS title in February 2025. This title follows a 2024 CIF-SS Eastern Division title from the previous year.

=== CIF-SS titles ===
- 2020 CIF-SS Division 2 Boys Basketball Champions
- 2023 CIF-SS Eastern Division Girls Wrestling Champions
- 2024 CIF-SS Northern Division Girls Wrestling Champions

== Notable alumni ==
- Tyson Miller – American baseball player (born 1995) – Texas Rangers pitcher
- Taylor Ward – American baseball player (born 1993) – Los Angeles Angels infielder
