= James Dockery =

American football player (born 1988)

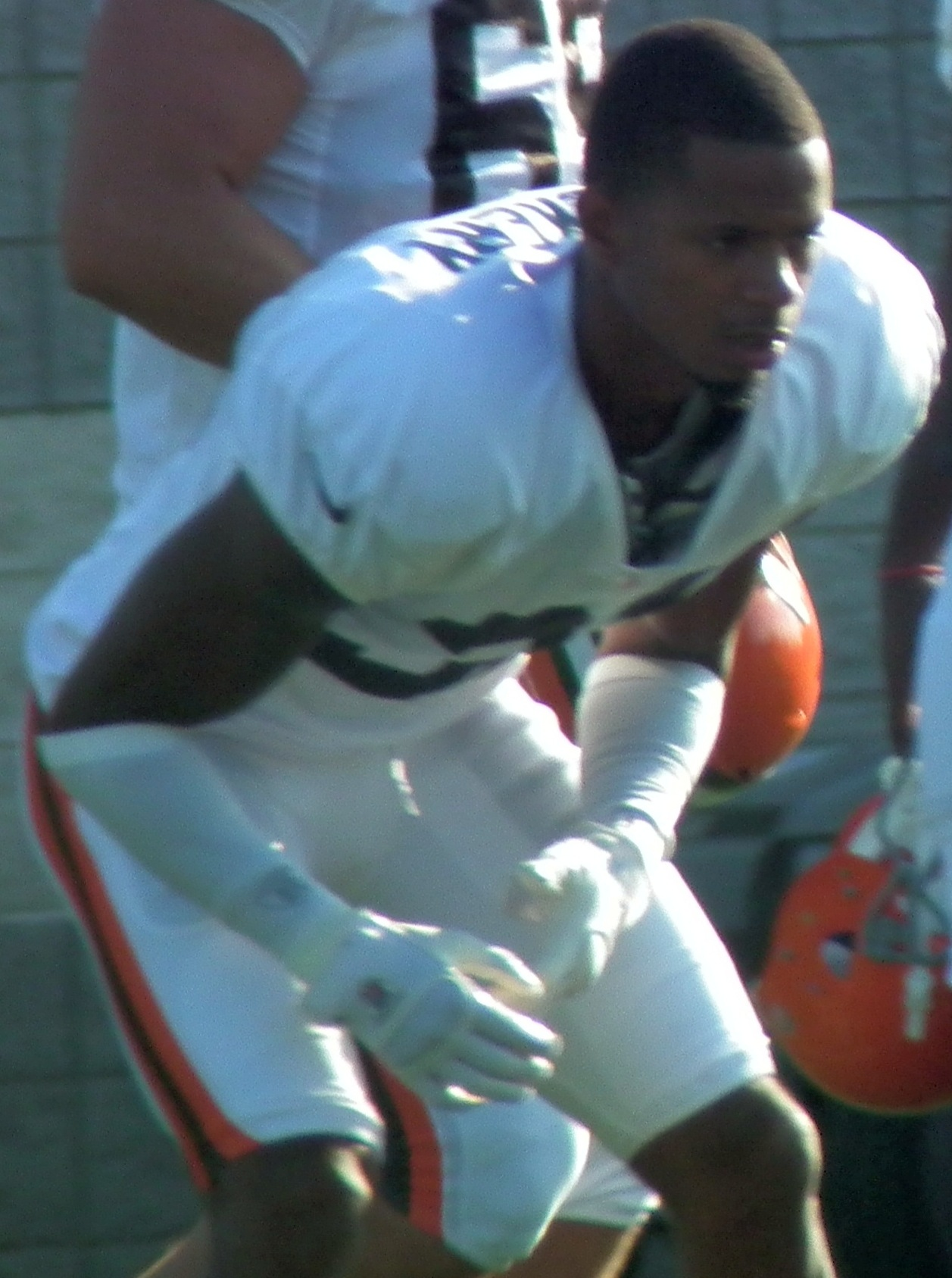
- Dockery in Cleveland Browns training camp in 2012

No. 34, 31
- Position: Cornerback

Personal information
- Born: November 9, 1988 (age 37); West Covina, California, U.S.
- Listed height: 6 ft 1 in (1.85 m)
- Listed weight: 185 lb (84 kg)

Career information
- High school: Palm Desert (Palm Desert, California)
- College: Oregon State
- NFL draft: 2011: undrafted

Career history
- Cleveland Browns (2011); Carolina Panthers (2012–2014); Oakland Raiders (2015)*
- * Offseason or practice squad member only

Career NFL statistics
- Total tackles: 39
- Pass deflections: 1
- Stats at Pro Football Reference

James Dockery (born November 9, 1988) is an American former professional football player who was a cornerback in the National Football League (NFL). He played for the Cleveland Browns and Carolina Panthers. He played college football for the Oregon State Beavers. He was previously the head coach at Xavier College Preparatory High School in Palm Desert, California. He and the school parted ways after the 2025 season. Dockery is currently the head football coach at Indio High School.
