= De Anza League =

California High School sports league

The De Anza League was a California High School sports league in San Bernardino County, California and Riverside County, California and was disbanded at the end of 2017-2018 high school sports season. Most teams joined the Desert Valley League while Rancho Mirage high school joined the newly formed Desert Empire League. It was part of the CIF Southern Section.

The seven teams in the league were:

- Coachella Valley High School - Arabs
- Desert Hot Springs High School - Golden Eagles
- Desert Mirage High School - Rams
- Rancho Mirage High School - Rattlers
- Twentynine Palms High School - Wildcats
- Yucca Valley High School - Trojans
