= Coachella Valley (disambiguation) =

Coachella Valley is a valley in California, United States.

Coachella Valley may also refer to:

- Coachella Valley Unified School District, a public school district serving areas of the Coachella Valley
  - Coachella Valley High School, a high school in the Coachella Valley Unified School District
- Coachella Valley Music and Arts Festival, held in Indio, California
- Coachella Valley Firebirds, a professional ice hockey team in Thousand Palms, California

== See also ==
- Coachella (disambiguation)
