= Taylor Ward =

American baseball player (born 1993)

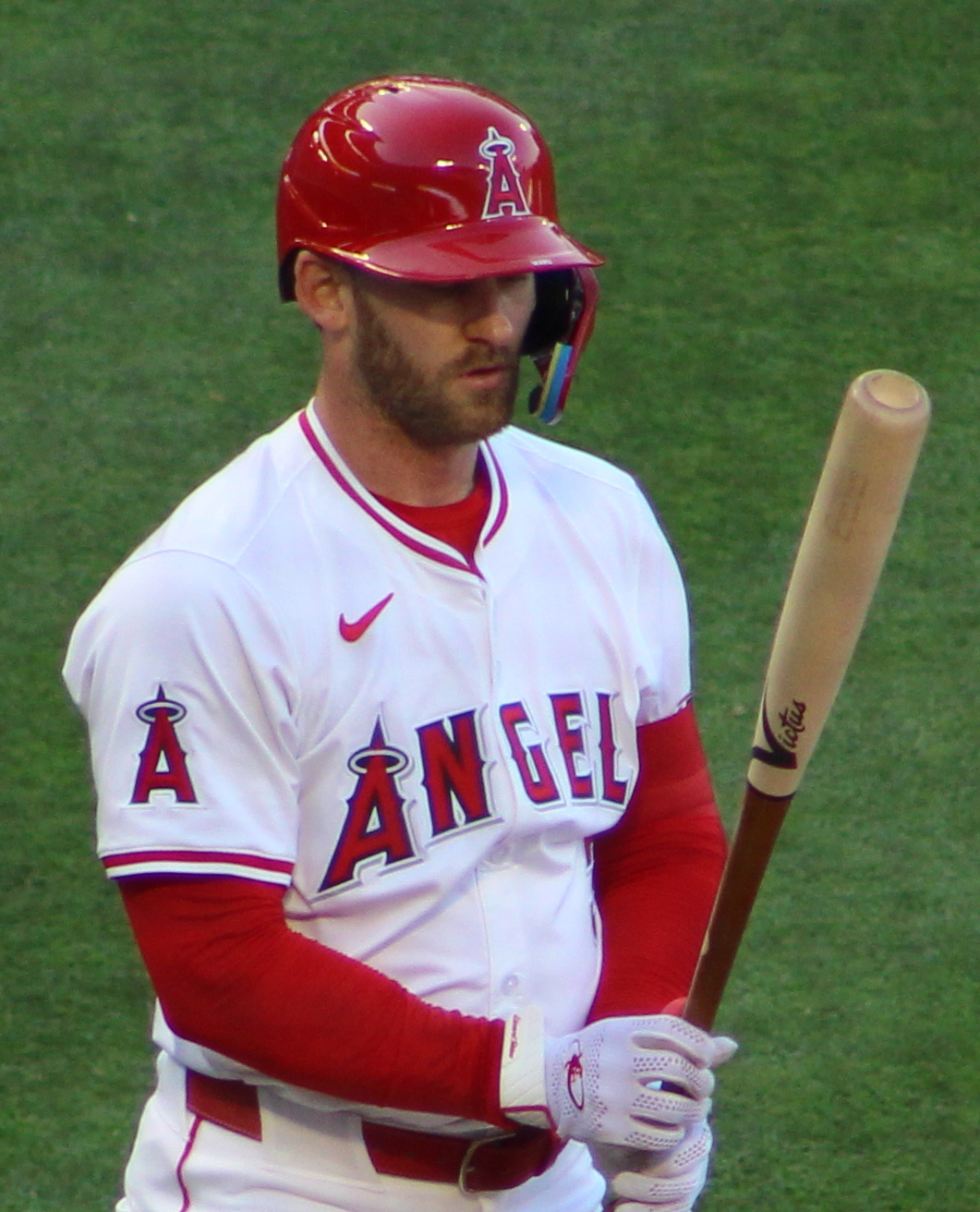
- Ward with the Los Angeles Angels in 2024

Free agent
- Left fielder / Designated hitter
- Born: December 14, 1993 (age 32); Dayton, Ohio, U.S.
- Bats: Right Throws: Right

MLB debut
- August 14, 2018, for the Los Angeles Angels

MLB statistics (through 2026 season)
- Batting average: .243
- Home runs: 120
- Runs batted in: 382
- Stats at Baseball Reference

Teams
- Los Angeles Angels (2018–2025); Baltimore Orioles (2026); Seattle Mariners (2026)

Joseph Taylor Ward (born December 14, 1993) is an American professional baseball outfielder who is a free agent. He has played in Major League Baseball (MLB) for the Los Angeles Angels, Baltimore Orioles, and Seattle Mariners.

Ward was raised in Central Florida before moving to Indio, California, where he attended Shadow Hills High School and emerged as a notable baseball prospect as a catcher. He played three seasons of college baseball for the Fresno State Bulldogs, earning multiple conference accolades. The Angels drafted Ward in the first round of the 2015 MLB draft, 26th overall. After spending four seasons in the Angels farm system and being converted to a third baseman, he made his MLB debut in 2018.

In his first four major league seasons, Ward did not find consistent playing time and was sent back down to the minor leagues on multiple occasions. In 2019, the Angels converted him to primarily play the outfield, forcing him to compete with fellow top prospects Jo Adell and Brandon Marsh for a spot while veterans Mike Trout, Justin Upton, and Kole Calhoun received most of the playing time. In 2022, Ward became the Angels' primary right fielder and was credited with a breakout season after he hit 23 home runs and led qualified Angels batters with a .281 batting average and a .360 on-base percentage (OBP).

In 2023, Ward moved to left field, where he spent three seasons as one of the top producers for the Angels. In 2025, he recorded a career-high 36 home runs and a team-leading 103 runs batted in (RBIs). The following offseason, the Angels traded Ward to the Orioles. Baltimore then traded him to Seattle in August 2026.

== Early life ==
Ward was born on December 12, 1993, in Dayton, Ohio. His family moved to Oviedo, Florida, a suburb of Orlando. He enrolled at Hagerty High School for his freshman year of high school in 2008.

In 2009, Ward's family moved to the Coachella Valley in Southern California, where he enrolled at the newly-opened Shadow Hills High School in Indio for his sophomore year. He played catcher for the Shadow Hills baseball team and was a two-time De Anza League First Team selection. In his junior season, he was named the De Anza League Most Valuable Player and Offensive Player of the Year while also earning First Team honors in the California Interscholastic Federation Southern Section. In his senior season, he caught for future MLB pitcher Tyson Miller, forming the team's top battery. Ward committed to play college baseball for the Fresno State Bulldogs, becoming the first Shadow Hills student to receive an athletic scholarship from an NCAA Division I school. The Tampa Bay Rays selected Ward in the 31st round of the 2012 MLB draft, but he did not sign with the team, moving forward with his plans to attend college.

== College career ==
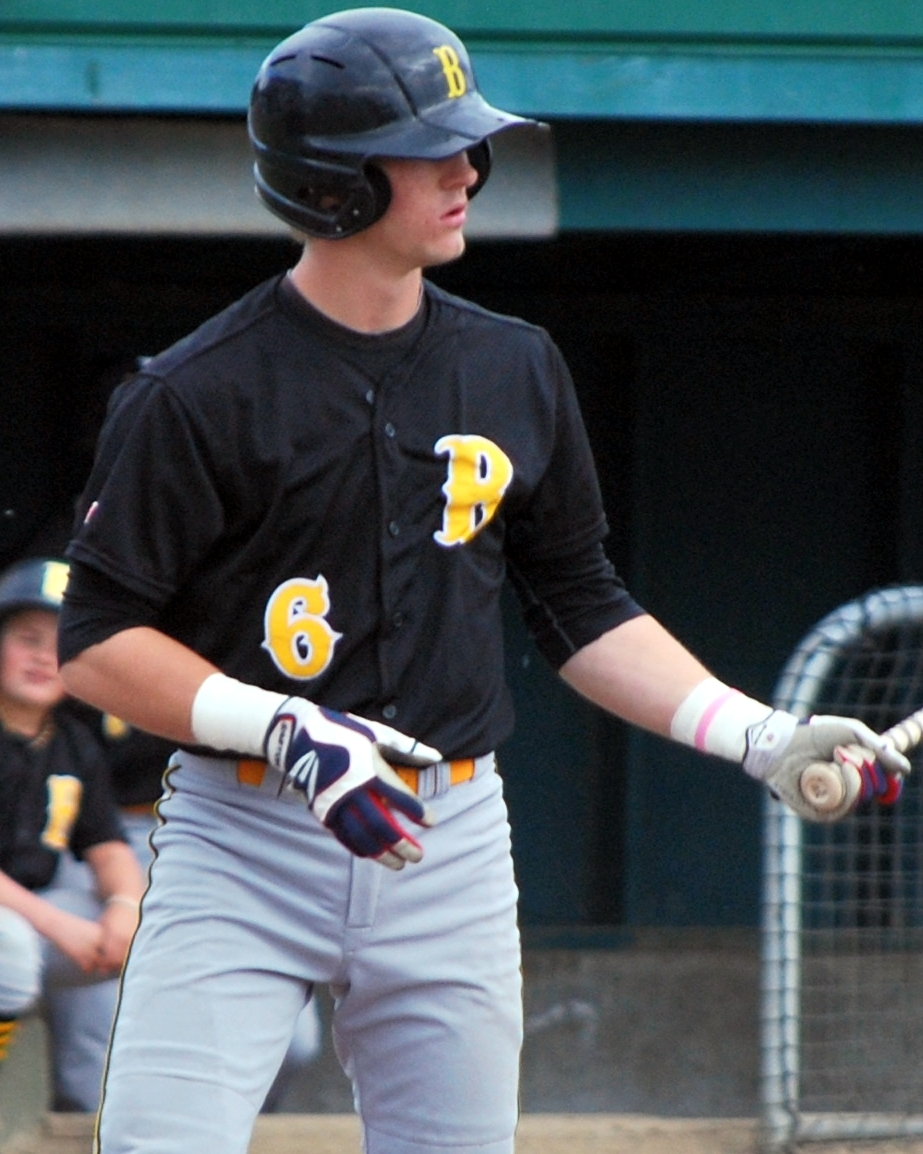
Ward with the Anchorage Bucs in 2013

Ward enrolled at California State University, Fresno, to play college baseball for the Fresno State Bulldogs. In 2013, his freshman season, Ward's teammates included eventual major leaguers Aaron Judge, Jordan Luplow, and Austin Wynns. In his first college season, Ward posted a .196 batting average with three home runs and 15 runs batted in (RBIs) in 46 games. After the season, he made his collegiate summer baseball debut with the Anchorage Bucs of the Alaska Baseball League, batting .206 with three RBIs in 19 games.

In 2014, during his sophomore season, Ward earned two Mountain West Conference Player of the Week selections, first on February 24 and later on March 3. He finished the season batting .320 with six home runs and 41 RBIs, ranking second on the team in each category behind Luplow. He was named to the All-Mountain West second team as a catcher. Following the season, he was given a tryout for the United States collegiate national baseball team on May 28; he made the 24-man roster on June 30. Ward also played summer baseball with the Orleans Firebirds of the Cape Cod Baseball League, joining Jake Cronenworth, Bobby Dalbec, and David Fletcher on the team. In seven games for Orleans, Ward went 4-for-20 (.222) with a home run and two RBIs.

In 2015, his junior season, Ward batted .304 with seven home runs and 42 RBIs, leading the team in the latter two categories. He was named to the All-Mountain West first team as a catcher. Ward was a finalist for the Johnny Bench Award, given annually to the best college baseball catcher.

== Professional career ==
=== Los Angeles Angels ===
==== Draft and minor leagues ====
In 2015, Ward was ranked as the 70th-best draft prospect by Baseball America and 99th by MLB.com. The Los Angeles Angels selected him in the first round of the 2015 MLB draft with the 26th overall pick. He became the 17th Fresno State player selected in the first round of the MLB draft, succeeding Aaron Judge's 2013 first-round selection. Ward was one of three Fresno State players selected in the 2015 draft. He signed with the Angels on June 12 for a $1,670,000 bonus, below the recommended $2,036,000 for the 26th draft slot.

Ward made his professional debut with the Rookie Advanced-level Orem Owlz, going 0-for-4 against the Ogden Raptors in his first game on June 18, 2015. He recorded his first professional hit on June 23, a single off Grand Junction Rockies pitcher Chad Zurat. Ward was selected as a Pioneer League All-Star, scoring a run during the exhibition on August 4. In 32 games with Orem, Ward batted .349 with two home runs, 19 RBIs, a .489 on-base percentage (OBP), and .459 slugging percentage (SLG). On August 6, he was promoted to the Single-A Burlington Bees of the Midwest League. Between the two teams, he batted .348 with three home runs and 31 RBIs in 56 games.

In 2016, Ward was invited to Angels spring training for the first time. He was promoted to High-A, spending the entire year with the Inland Empire 66ers of the California League. He batted .249 with ten home runs and 56 RBIs in 123 games. Following the season, he played for the Scottsdale Scorpions of the Arizona Fall League (AFL). He was selected as an AFL All-Star and finished batting .283 with nine RBIs in 16 games. MiLB.com named Ward an Angels Organization All-Star for 2016.

In 2017, Ward returned to Inland Empire to begin the season. On April 5, he was placed on the 7-day disabled list, returning on May 3. In 54 games with the 66ers, Ward batted .242 with six home runs and 30 RBIs. On July 20, he was promoted to the Double-A Mobile BayBears of the Southern League, remaining with the team for the rest of the season. In 87 games between both teams, Ward batted .258 with nine home runs and 49 RBIs. MiLB.com named him an Angels Organization All-Star for the second straight season.

Prior to the 2018 season, the Angels converted Ward from catcher to a third baseman. He started the year by returning to Mobile, where he made his professional debut at third base on April 5. Ward was named a Southern League mid-season All-Star. In 42 games with Mobile, Ward batted .345 with six home runs and 25 RBIs. On June 2, Ward was promoted to the Triple-A Salt Lake Bees of the Pacific Coast League. In 60 games with Salt Lake, he batted .352 with eight home runs and 35 RBIs. Following the season, Ward was again named an Angels Organization All-Star by MiLB.com

==== 2018–2020: MLB debut, inconsistent playing time ====
Ward was called up to the majors for the first time on August 14, 2018, and made his MLB debut that day against the San Diego Padres at Petco Park. In his first plate appearance, Ward hit an RBI double off Brett Kennedy. He finished his debut at 2-for-3 with an RBI and a walk. Ward hit his first major league home run on August 18, a solo shot off Eddie Butler. He finished his brief first season in the majors hitting .178 with six home runs and 15 RBIs in 40 games.

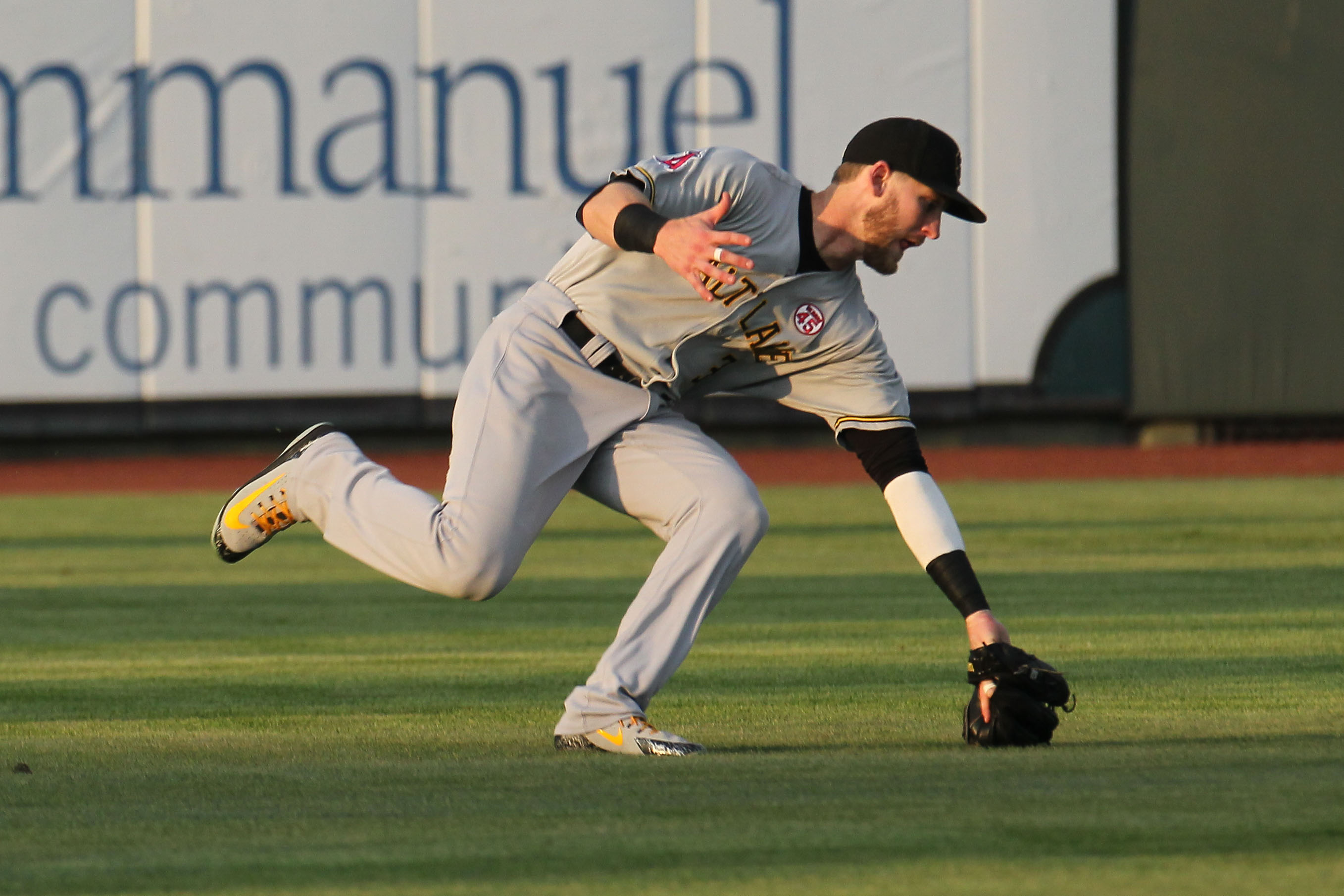
Ward with the Salt Lake Bees in 2019

In 2019, Ward was intermittently sent between Triple-A and the major leagues, including five options to Salt Lake before August. He received minimal playing time at third base as the Angels gave Zack Cozart, David Fletcher, and Matt Thaiss a majority of time at the position. During a minor league stint in May, Ward was converted to play left fielder. In September, the Angels gave him his longest stint of the year with the major league club to replace an injured Justin Upton in left field. Ward batted .306 with 27 home runs and 71 RBIs in 106 games with Salt Lake and .292 with a home run and two RBIs in 20 games with the Angels.

Ward began the COVID-19-shortened 2020 season in the major leagues, switching between left field and right field to flank center fielder Mike Trout. On August 18, the Angels optioned Ward to the alternate training site being used in lieu of the cancelled minor league season. He was recalled to the major leagues on September 3 and finished the season with the Angels. In 34 games, he hit .277 with five RBIs.

==== 2021–2022: Emergence in the outfield ====
In May 2021, Ward joined the Angels as a right fielder. He was batting .215 with four home runs through his first month, but his batting average improved as the season progressed. On June 17, Ward hit his first career grand slam, coming off Kyle Funkhouser in the seventh inning of a 7–5 win over the Detroit Tigers. On July 22, Ward was optioned to Salt Lake. He was placed on the 7-day injured list on July 30 and began a rehab assignment with the Arizona Complex League Angels on September 16. He was recalled to the major leagues on September 29 but returned to the injured list on October 3 for a right adductor strain. Ward finished 2021 hitting .250 with eight home runs and 33 RBIs in 65 games.

Ward began the 2022 season on the 10-day injured list with a groin strain he suffered during spring training. He made his season debut on April 16, going 2-for-3 with a solo home run against the Texas Rangers. On April 25, Ward hit two home runs and provided all the offense in his first multi-homer game, a 3–0 victory over the Cleveland Guardians. Two days later, still facing Cleveland, Ward went 3-for-4 with a double, a walk, his second career grand slam, and a triple, falling a single shy from hitting for the cycle in a 9–5 victory. Ward was named the American League Player of the Week for April 25 – May 1, a span where he batted .448 with a .484 OBP, a 1.000 SLG, 10 runs scored, and 11 RBIs. On May 14, Ward hit a grand slam in a 9–1 win over the Oakland Athletics. On May 20, Ward exited a game against the Athletics after colliding with the right field wall and was considered day-to-day. Ward suffered a hamstring injury in a game against the Philadelphia Phillies on June 3 and was placed on the injured list on June 5. He returned to the Angels' lineup on June 14. Midway through the season, it was discovered that Ward's bat speed had dropped by about 4 miles per hour (6.4 km/h) since his wall collision in May. Between the collision and the end of July, Ward batted .217 with a .610 on-base plus slugging percentage (OPS), a decrease from his pre-injury numbers. On August 13, Ward hit a walk-off two-run home run in the 11th inning of a game against the Minnesota Twins, his second career walk-off homer, to win 5–3. In late August, Ward did not make the Angels' trip for a series against the Toronto Blue Jays because of a Canadian travel ban against foreign nationals who had not received a COVID-19 vaccine, costing him $11,868. Ward finished the 2022 season batting .281 with 23 home runs and 65 RBIs in 135 games. His .281 batting average and .360 OBP was the highest among qualified Angels batters, and his 3.7 Wins Above Replacement (WAR) was third-most on the team.

==== 2023–2025: Everyday left fielder ====
On January 13, 2023, Ward signed a one-year, $2.75 million contract with the Angels, avoiding salary arbitration. Prior to the start of the season, it was announced that Ward would be moved from right field to left field to account for the team's trade acquisition of Hunter Renfroe. On June 23, he made his only MLB appearance at catcher, replacing an injured Kurt Suzuki in extra innings. During a game against the Toronto Blue Jays on July 28, Ward took a pitch to the head, suffering multiple facial fractures. He was placed on the 60-day injured list the following day, ending his season. In 97 games, he batted .253 with 14 home runs and 47 RBI. In early August, Ward had three plates inserted in his face and a nasal reconstruction surgery due to the injuries. The injury limited his ability to breathe through his nose or drink with a straw.

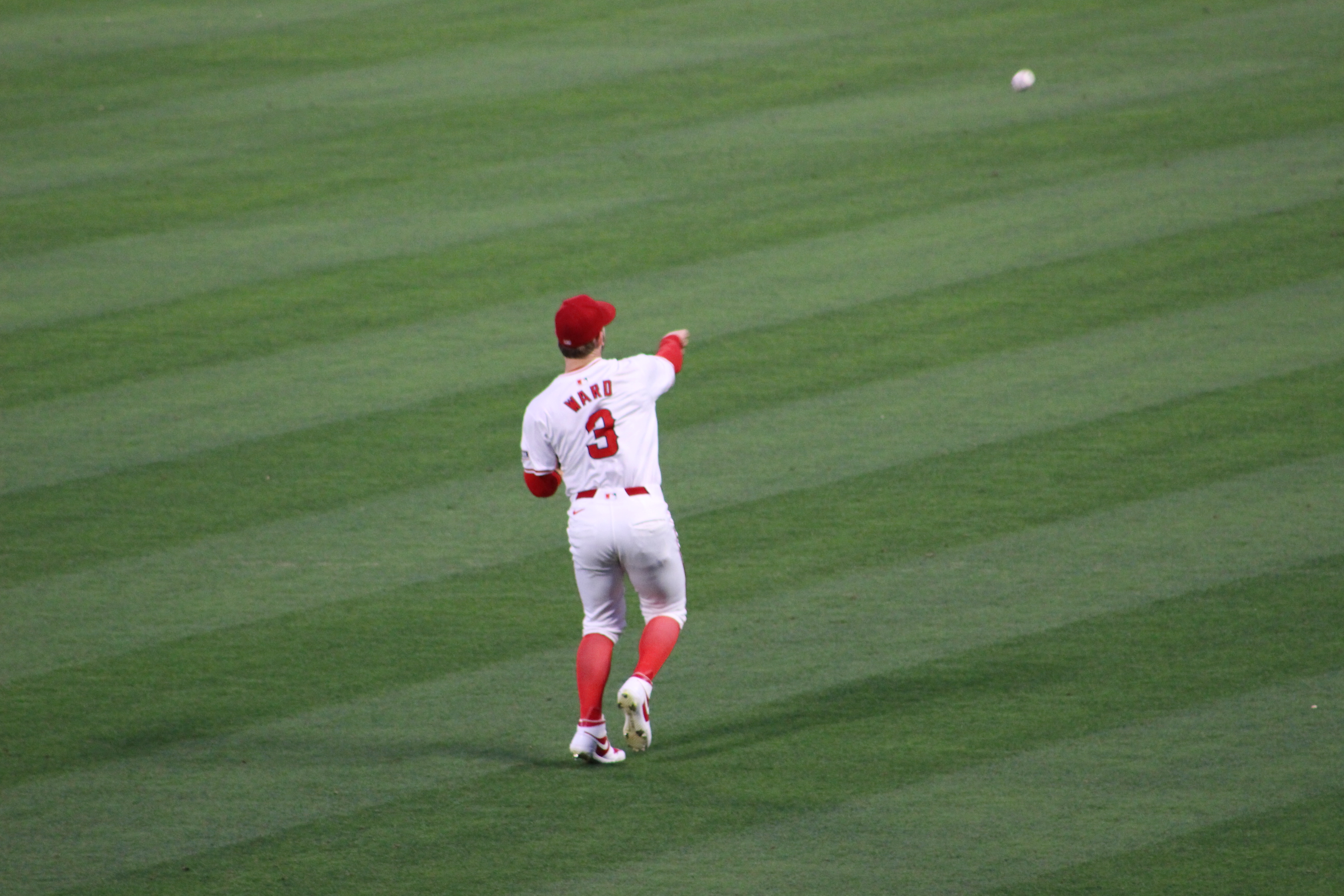
Ward playing in left field in 2024.

By spring training in 2024, Ward had fully recovered from his injury and began playing again, using an extended flap on his batting helmet to protect his face. Following the departure of Shohei Ohtani in free agency and injuries to Mike Trout and Anthony Rendon, Ward became one of the top run-producers in the Angels lineup. Through late May, he drove in a team-best 32 runs but told The Orange County Register that he likes having other batters ahead of him in the lineup to "take the microscope off" him. On May 28, Ward hit a go-ahead two-run double off of New York Yankees closer Clay Holmes in the eighth inning to lead the Angels to a comeback victory. On June 21, Ward hit a game-winning RBI single in the top of the 10th inning against the Los Angeles Dodgers at Dodger Stadium. On June 30, Detroit Tigers pitcher Shelby Miller hit Ward in the helmet with a fastball at 93 miles per hour (150 km/h). Ward remained on the field after the incident but began slumping in the two weeks after, batting .140 with a .376 OPS in 47 plate appearances. On July 28, he hit a go-ahead grand slam to complete a six-run comeback against the Athletics. He hit four lead off home runs in September, the most by any player in a month in franchise history. He finished the season batting .246 with 25 home runs and 75 RBI in 156 games, leading the Angels in hits, home runs, runs and total bases.

On May 12, 2025, Ward hit a go-ahead grand slam in the ninth inning off Padres closer Robert Suárez in a 9–5 Angels victory at Petco Park. On May 22, he hit another go-ahead grand slam in the seventh inning against the Athletics at Sutter Health Park in a 10–5 victory. On May 24, he broke Darin Erstad's Angels franchise record with his 10th consecutive game recording an extra-base hit. On May 26, Ward was awarded the American League Player of the Week award for May 19–25, a span in which he batted .407 (11–27) with nine runs, three home runs, 12 RBI, and an OPS of 1.382. It was his second weekly award. On July 19, he hit his 100th career MLB home run. On August 31, he was removed from the game and hospitalized after crashing into a metal scoreboard at Daikin Park during a win over the Houston Astros. He finished the season batting .228 with 36 home runs and a team-leading 103 RBI in 157 games. He received the Good Guy Award from the Anaheim chapter of the Baseball Writers' Association of America.

=== Baltimore Orioles ===
On November 18, 2025, the Angels traded Ward to the Baltimore Orioles for pitcher Grayson Rodriguez. He agreed to a $12.175 million contract with Baltimore in January 2026. With the Orioles, Ward had a .247 average and .384 OBP. He walked a career-high 86 times in a partial season with Baltimore but only hit seven home runs.

=== Seattle Mariners ===
On August 3, 2026, the Orioles traded Ward to the Seattle Mariners in exchange for relief pitcher Alex Hoppe and minor league pitchers Brock Moore and Harrison Kreiling.

== Player profile ==
As a prospect in 2018, MLB.com graded Ward on its 20–80 scale with a 50 for hitting, 40 for power, 40 for running, 65 for arm strength, 50 for fielding, and 50 overall. The report credited his "excellent plate discipline" and "very advanced approach" that generates walks and limits strikeouts. The report profiled Ward as a contact hitter but noted his uptick in home run power at the time.

In 2017, former Houston Astros minor leaguer Trent Woodward began teaching Ward a system that uses a "range" of swing styles rather than just one style to enhance results. Fox Sports journalist Pedro Moura wrote that the system emphasizes "holding the bat at a 90-degree angle to his spine and trying to match the angle of the incoming pitch with a slight uppercut in his swing". The two met once a month to train. In 2021, Angels manager Joe Maddon criticized the approach, suggesting that an overemphasis on contact angle was decreasing Ward's productivity. Ward later said that Maddon didn't know all the aspects his swing.

Ward ranked fifth in the American League in home runs in 2025, then adopted a more patient approach in 2026, with a career high in walks and swinging at few pitches outside the strike zone.

== Personal life ==
Ward's wife gave birth to their first child on November 21, 2022. Ward has two siblings.

In college, Ward said his favorite athlete was Mike Napoli.
