= YVHS =

YVHS can refer to:

- Ygnacio Valley High School located in Concord, California.
- Yucca Valley High School located in Yucca Valley, California.
