= La Quinta High School =

La Quinta High School can refer to:

- La Quinta High School (La Quinta, California)
- La Quinta High School (Westminster, California)
