= Palm Desert, California =

- City
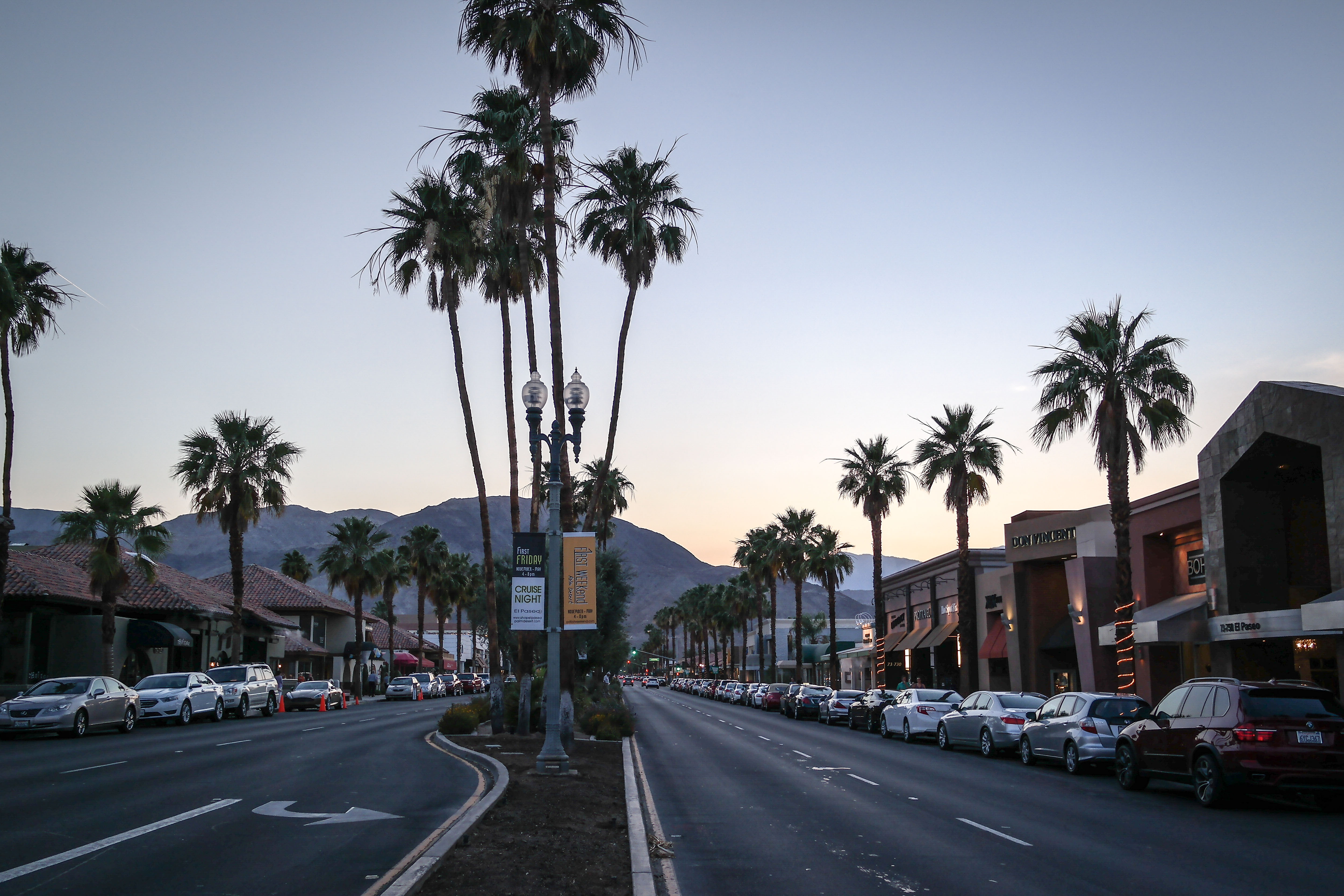
- El Paseo in Palm Desert

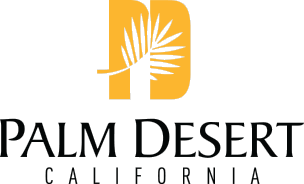
- Flag
- Nicknames: P. D., Palm Deezy
- Motto: "Feel The Warmth"
- Interactive map of Palm Desert, California
- Location in the United States Palm Desert, California (California) Palm Desert, California (the United States)
- Coordinates: 33°43′20″N 116°22′28″W
- Country: United States
- State: California
- County: Riverside
- Incorporated: November 26, 1973

Government
  - Type: Council–manager
  - Mayor: Evan Trubee
  - Mayor Pro Tem: Joe Pradetto
  - City Council: Gina Nestande; Karina Quintanilla; Jan Harnik

Area
  - Total: 27.02 sq mi (69.97 km^{2})
  - Land: 26.81 sq mi (69.44 km^{2})
  - Water: 0.20 sq mi (0.53 km^{2}) 0.76%
- Elevation: 220 ft (67 m)

Population (2020)
  - Total: 51,163
  - Estimate (2024): 53,147
  - Density: 1,908.4/sq mi (736.85/km^{2})
- Time zone: UTC-8 (Pacific)
  - Summer (DST): UTC-7 (PDT)
- ZIP Codes: 92210, 92211, 92255, 92260, 92261
- Area codes: 442/760
- FIPS code: 06-55184
- GNIS feature IDs: 1652767, 2411356
- Website: www.palmdesert.gov

Palm Desert is a city in the Coachella Valley region of Riverside County, California. The city is located in the Colorado Desert arm of the Sonoran Desert, about 14 miles (23 km) east of Palm Springs, 121 miles (195 km) northeast of San Diego and 122 miles (196 km) east of Los Angeles. The population was 51,163 at the 2020 census, and the city has been one of the state's fastest-growing since 1980, when its population was 11,801.

== History ==
Palm Desert is in the ancestral homeland of two now-extinct Cahuilla tribes - the Las Palmas band and the San Cayetano band - of the Cahuilla people, who are nowadays organized as a division of the Morongo Band of Mission Indians.

The area was first known as the Old MacDonald Ranch before the name changed to Palm Village in the 1920s when date palm groves were planted. That original tract is today referred to as the Palma Village neighborhood in the central part of the city. Most of the pre–World War II residents of Palm Desert were Cahuilla farmers of the San Cayetano band. The Montoya family of Cahuilla and Spanish descent were prominent civic leaders in the early years of Palm Desert.

The first large-scale residential development began in 1943 in connection with the United States Army's Desert Training Center, constructed in the area under the leadership of General George S. Patton during the Second World War in preparation for fighting in North Africa. After the war, the part of the site south of Highway 111 was developed into "El Paseo," an upscale shopping district modeled after Rodeo Drive. In 1948, the Palm Desert Corporation began to develop real estate, and in 1951 the area was given its present name.

After the war, Randall J. Henderson, publisher of Desert Magazine, relocated the magazine to the area and built a modern Pueblo-inspired building near Highway 111 and El Paseo with architect Harry J. Williams. His brother, aviation promoter Colonel Clifford W. Henderson, had envisioned a planned desert community. Clifford Henderson acquired approximately 1,622 acres and in March 1945 formed the Palm Desert Corporation with investors including Edgar Bergen and Leonard Firestone.

The Henderson brothers, assisted by landscape designer Tommy Tomson (their brother-in-law), devised the street plan and aesthetic layout. Phil and Carl Henderson, brothers of Randall and Clifford, also contributed; however, Phil died in the late 1940s before the development was completed.

A U.S. Post Office opened on July 14, 1947. In 1948, the Palm Desert Corporation began construction of the Shadow Mountain Club, featuring a figure-eight pool, golf course, hotel, restaurant, and entertainment amenities. In 1951, the town adopted the name Palm Desert and absorbed Palm Village.

On November 26, 1973, Palm Desert was incorporated as the 17th city in Riverside County. At incorporation, the city covered about 8.5 square miles with a population of approximately 14,166. Since then, both population and area have expanded significantly.

== Geography ==
According to the United States Census Bureau, the city has an area of 27.0 square miles (70 km^{2}), of which 26.96 square miles (69.8 km^{2}) is land and 0.2 square miles (0.52 km^{2}), or 0.76%, is water.

The elevation (at City Hall) is 224 feet (68 m) above sea level. Elevations vary from the lower northern half once covered in sand dunes to the upper slope southern cove (300–900 feet or 91–274 meters) all the way to the ridgeline at 1,000 feet (300 m). Palm Desert is in the Coachella Valley, the northwestern extension of the Sonoran Desert.

=== Climate ===
The Coachella Valley's climate is influenced by high mountain ranges on three sides and a south-sloping valley floor contribute to its year-round warmth. Its winters are among the warmest in the western U.S. Palm Desert has a hot desert climate: its average annual high temperature is 88 °F (31.1 °C) and average annual low is 64 °F (17.8 °C), but summer highs above 108 °F (42.2 °C) are common and sometimes exceed 120 °F (48.9 °C), while summer night lows often stay above 82 °F (27.8 °C). Winters are warm, with daytime highs between 70–82 °F (21–28 °C). Under 3 inches (76.2 mm) of annual precipitation is average, with over 348 days of sunshine per year. The mean annual temperature, at 76 °F (24.4 °C), makes Palm Desert one of the warmest places in the country. The hottest temperature ever recorded in Palm Desert was 125 °F (51.7 °C), on July 6, 1905.

Climate data for Palm Desert, California (Indio Fire STN) elev. 10 feet (3.0 m) (1991–2020)
Month	Jan	Feb	Mar	Apr	May	Jun	Jul	Aug	Sep	Oct	Nov	Dec	Year
Record high °F (°C)	97 (36)	100 (38)	103 (39)	109 (43)	117 (47)	123 (51)	125 (52)	121 (49)	122 (50)	115 (46)	101 (38)	93 (34)	125 (52)
Mean daily maximum °F (°C)	70.3 (21.3)	73.3 (22.9)	79.9 (26.6)	85.8 (29.9)	93.1 (33.9)	101.7 (38.7)	105.8 (41.0)	105.2 (40.7)	100.8 (38.2)	90.5 (32.5)	78.0 (25.6)	68.8 (20.4)	87.8 (31.0)
Daily mean °F (°C)	58.6 (14.8)	62.2 (16.8)	68.5 (20.3)	74.5 (23.6)	81.2 (27.3)	89.2 (31.8)	94.1 (34.5)	93.8 (34.3)	88.7 (31.5)	78.1 (25.6)	65.5 (18.6)	57.0 (13.9)	76.0 (24.4)
Mean daily minimum °F (°C)	46.8 (8.2)	51.0 (10.6)	57.2 (14.0)	63.1 (17.3)	69.3 (20.7)	76.6 (24.8)	82.5 (28.1)	82.5 (28.1)	76.5 (24.7)	65.8 (18.8)	53.0 (11.7)	45.3 (7.4)	64.1 (17.8)
Record low °F (°C)	13 (−11)	20 (−7)	25 (−4)	33 (1)	38 (3)	45 (7)	59 (15)	56 (13)	46 (8)	31 (−1)	23 (−5)	19 (−7)	13 (−11)
Average precipitation inches (mm)	0.65 (17)	0.59 (15)	0.32 (8.1)	0.07 (1.8)	0.02 (0.51)	0.00 (0.00)	0.05 (1.3)	0.26 (6.6)	0.13 (3.3)	0.15 (3.8)	0.19 (4.8)	0.49 (12)	2.92 (74)
Source: www.ncdc.noaa.gov

The surrounding mountains create a thermal belt in the southern foothills of Palm Desert, namely Cahuilla Hills and Bighorn, leading to a micro-climate with significantly warmer night-time temperatures during the winter months. The University of California maintains weather stations located in this thermal belt as part of their ecological project in the Philip L. Boyd Deep Canyon Desert Research Center.

Climate data for South Palm Desert, California elev. 980 feet (298.7 m) (Boyd Deep Canyon Ctr) 1981–2010
Month	Jan	Feb	Mar	Apr	May	Jun	Jul	Aug	Sep	Oct	Nov	Dec	Year
Mean daily maximum °F (°C)	69.6 (20.9)	72.0 (22.2)	77.5 (25.3)	84.6 (29.2)	92.5 (33.6)	100.8 (38.2)	104.4 (40.2)	104.0 (40.0)	99.1 (37.3)	88.7 (31.5)	77.0 (25.0)	68.5 (20.3)	86.6 (30.3)
Daily mean °F (°C)	60.4 (15.8)	62.6 (17.0)	66.8 (19.3)	72.6 (22.6)	79.4 (26.3)	86.9 (30.5)	91.5 (33.1)	91.8 (33.2)	87.5 (30.8)	78.4 (25.8)	67.5 (19.7)	59.4 (15.2)	75.4 (24.1)
Mean daily minimum °F (°C)	51.1 (10.6)	53.1 (11.7)	56.1 (13.4)	60.6 (15.9)	66.2 (19.0)	73.0 (22.8)	78.6 (25.9)	79.5 (26.4)	75.9 (24.4)	68.0 (20.0)	57.9 (14.4)	50.2 (10.1)	64.2 (17.9)
Average precipitation inches (mm)	0.86 (22)	0.86 (22)	0.56 (14)	0.16 (4.1)	0.07 (1.8)	0.02 (0.51)	0.44 (11)	0.59 (15)	0.53 (13)	0.24 (6.1)	0.44 (11)	0.69 (18)	5.52 (140)
Source: deepcanyon.ucnrs.org

== Demographics ==
Race / Ethnicity (NH = Non-Hispanic)	Pop 1980	Pop 1990	Pop 2000	Pop 2010	Pop 2020	% 1980	% 1990	% 2000	% 2010	% 2020
White alone (NH)	10,343	19,359	31,919	34,115	32,535	88.43%	83.26%	77.56%	70.42%	63.59%
Black or African American alone (NH)	140	197	446	782	935	1.20%	0.85%	1.08%	1.61%	1.83%
Native American or Alaska Native alone (NH)	61	77	117	143	120	0.52%	0.33%	0.28%	0.30%	0.23%
Asian alone (NH)	139	399	117	1,587	2,364	1.19%	1.72%	2.52%	3.28%	4.62%
Native Hawaiian or Pacific Islander alone (NH)	139	399	34	49	57	1.19%	1.72%	0.08%	0.10%	0.11%
Other race alone (NH)	24	24	46	78	218	0.21%	0.10%	0.12%	0.16%	0.43%
Mixed race or Multiracial (NH)	x	x	526	653	1,619	x	x	1.28%	1.35%	3.16%
Hispanic or Latino (any race)	1,094	3,196	7,031	11,038	13,315	9.35%	13.75%	17.08%	22.78%	26.02%
Total	11,696	23,252	41,155	48,445	51,153	100.00%	100.00%	100.00%	100.00%	100.00%

Historical population
Census	Pop.	Note	%±
1980	11,801		—
1990	23,252		97.0%
2000	41,155		77.0%
2010	48,445		17.7%
2020	51,163		5.6%
2024 (est.)	53,147	▲	3.9%
U.S. Decennial Census

=== 2020 census ===
As of the 2020 census, Palm Desert had a population of 51,163, a 5.6% increase from 48,445 in 2010. The median age was 56.1 years. 13.7% of residents were under the age of 18 and 36.8% of residents were 65 years of age or older. For every 100 females there were 87.0 males, and for every 100 females age 18 and over there were 85.0 males age 18 and over.

99.7% of residents lived in urban areas, while 0.3% lived in rural areas.

There were 24,508 households in Palm Desert, of which 17.0% had children under the age of 18 living in them. Of all households, 41.5% were married-couple households, 18.3% were households with a male householder and no spouse or partner present, and 33.6% were households with a female householder and no spouse or partner present. About 36.6% of all households were made up of individuals and 22.6% had someone living alone who was 65 years of age or older.

There were 35,755 housing units, of which 31.5% were vacant. The homeowner vacancy rate was 3.0% and the rental vacancy rate was 11.1%.

Racial composition as of the 2020 census
Race	Number	Percent
White	35,139	68.7%
Black or African American	1,022	2.0%
American Indian and Alaska Native	424	0.8%
Asian	2,440	4.8%
Native Hawaiian and Other Pacific Islander	71	0.1%
Some other race	6,161	12.0%
Two or more races	5,906	11.5%

=== 2010 census ===
The 2010 United States census reported that Palm Desert had a population of 48,445. The population density was 1,793.3 inhabitants per square mile (692.4/km^{2}). The racial makeup of Palm Desert was 39,957 (82.5%) White (70.4% Non-Hispanic White), 875 (1.8%) African American, 249 (0.5%) Native American, 1,647 (3.4%) Asian, 55 (0.1%) Pacific Islander, 4,427 (9.1%) from other races, and 1,235 (2.5%) from two or more races. There were 11,038 residents of Hispanic or Latino origin (22.8%).

The Census reported that 48,137 people (99.4% of the population) lived in households, 98 (0.2%) lived in non-institutionalized group quarters, and 210 (0.4%) were institutionalized.

There were 23,117 households, out of which 4,253 (18.4%) had children under the age of 18 living in them, 10,253 (44.4%) were opposite-sex married couples living together, 2,177 (9.4%) had a female householder with no husband present, 811 (3.5%) had a male householder with no wife present. There were 1,227 (5.3%) unmarried opposite-sex partnerships, and 373 (1.6%) same-sex married couples or partnerships. 7,948 households (34.4%) were made up of individuals, and 4,370 (18.9%) had someone living alone who was 65 years of age or older. The average household size was 2.08. There were 13,241 families (57.3% of all households); the average family size was 2.65.

The population was spread out, with 7,534 people (15.6%) under the age of 18, 3,333 people (6.9%) aged 18 to 24, 8,731 people (18.0%) aged 25 to 44, 12,924 people (26.7%) aged 45 to 64, and 15,923 people (32.9%) who were 65 years of age or older. The median age was 53.0 years. For every 100 females, there were 88.7 males. For every 100 females age 18 and over, there were 86.4 males.

There were 37,073 housing units at an average density of 1,372.4 per square mile (529.9/km^{2}), of which 15,171 (65.6%) were owner-occupied, and 7,946 (34.4%) were occupied by renters. The homeowner vacancy rate was 5.0%; the rental vacancy rate was 16.8%. 30,667 people (63.3% of the population) lived in owner-occupied housing units and 17,470 people (36.1%) lived in rental housing units.

According to the 2010 United States census, Palm Desert had a median household income of $53,456, with 9.2% of the population living below the federal poverty line.

=== 2000 census ===
According to the 2000 United States census, there were 41,155 people, 19,184 households, and 11,414 families residing in the city. The population density was 1,689.1 inhabitants per square mile (652.2/km^{2}). There were 28,021 housing units at an average density of 1,150.0 per square mile (444.0/km^{2}). The racial makeup of the city was 86.8% White, 1.2% African American, 0.5% Native American, 2.6% Asian, 0.1% Pacific Islander, 6.5% from other races, and 2.4% from two or more races. Hispanic or Latino of any race were 17.1% of the population.

There are 19,184 households in Palm Desert, out of which 18.9% had children under the age of 18 living with them, 48.5% were married couples living together, 7.7% had a female householder with no husband present, and 40.5% were non-families. 32.4% of all households were made up of individuals, and 15.2% had someone living alone who was 65 years of age or older. The average household size was 2.1 and the average family size was 2.7. The demographics of Palm Desert shows a rising population of children and young adults.

The age distribution of the population was 17.3% under the age of 18, 6.2% from 18 to 24, 22.7% from 25 to 44, 26.3% from 45 to 64, and 27.6% who were 65 years of age or older. The median age was 48 years.

The median income for a household in the city was $48,000 and the median income for a family was $58,183. Males had a median income of $42,257 versus $32,202 for females. The per capita income for the city was $33,463. About 5.9% of families and 9.2% of the population were below the poverty line, including 12.1% of those under age 18 and 4.3% of those age 65 or over.

== Economy ==
=== Top employers ===
According to the city's 2020 Comprehensive Annual Financial Report, the top employers in the city are:

No.	Employer	No. of Employees
1	JW Marriott Desert Springs Golf Resort; Marriott Desert Springs Villas	2,304
2	Universal Protection Service	1,500
3	Securitas	700
4	Avida Caregivers	550
5	Organization of Legal Pro's (sic)	501
6	Sunshine Landscape	500
7	Costco Wholesale	250
8	Big Horn Golf Club	250
9	Yellow Cab of Desert	160
10	Whole Foods Market	150

== Recreation ==
Palm Desert is the home of the Living Desert Zoo and Gardens, a combination zoo and botanical garden featuring over 500 animals from 150 species over 80 acres (32 ha). The location also hosts an extensive collection of desert plants with a state-of-the-art animal hospital. Founded in 1970, The Living Desert hosts over 500,000 visitors a year.

=== Resorts, tennis, and golf clubs ===
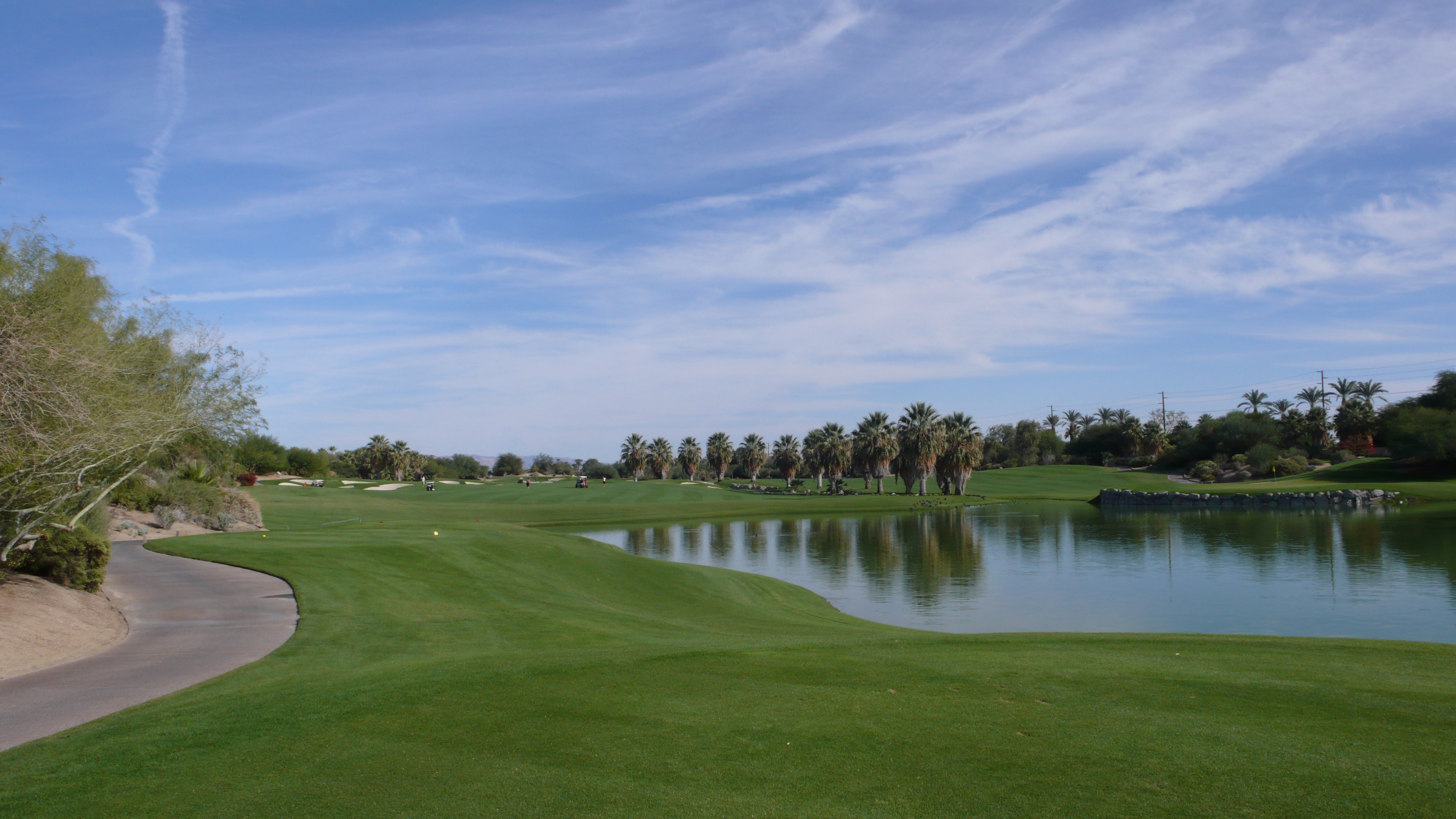
Desert Willow Golf Course

There are around thirty golf courses throughout the city which has a long history with the sport. Palm Desert is home to hundreds of tennis courts, both public and private. Pickleball has also gained popularity throughout the region in the 2010s and 2020s.

The city's first golf course and tennis club was Shadow Mountain in 1948, followed by Marrakesh in 1954, the Palm Desert Greens mobile home park golf course in 1961, and the Palm Desert Country Club in 1962. The latter, located five miles (8 km) east of the original city, was formally annexed in 1992. The total number of golf clubs (more than 30 located within 10 mi or 16 km from the city) have made Palm Desert known as the "World's Golf Capital."

Desert Willow Golf Resort is the City Of Palm Desert's municipal golf course, and has two championship courses: Mountain View and Firecliff. It is associated with the Westin Desert Willow Resort at the golf course location. The Firecliff course is listed at No. 13 in Golf Magazine's 'Best Courses you can Play' 2010 list for California.

In the late-1970s and 1980s, a spate of private golf clubs, destination resorts and hotels appeared in the northern half of Palm Desert, such as the four-star JW Marriott Desert Springs Golf Resort and Spa in 1987 and the four-star Desert Willow Golf Resort in 2002. The city has over 30 hotels and 5,000 rooms, and lodging and hospitality is a major portion of the local tourist-based economy.

Sun City Palm Desert is an adjacent master-planned retirement community located on the north side of Interstate 10, on unincorporated land just northeast of the city limits of Palm Desert itself, and about 7.7 miles (12.4 km) from downtown Palm Desert. All residences in the community use Palm Desert, CA 92211 as part of their address. The community association address is 38180 Del Webb Blvd., Palm Desert, CA 92211. Sun City Palm Desert comprises the majority of the Desert Palms census-designated place. Sun City Palm Desert was developed by Del E. Webb Corp. (acquired by Pulte Homes in 2001). Construction began in 1992 and was completed in 2003. The original name was Sun City Palm Springs from 1991 to 1996. Sun City Palm Desert is an active 55+ gated retirement community.

== Government ==
Palm Desert was incorporated as a city in 1973 and designated a charter city in 1997. It operates on a council-manager form of government. Residents of Palm Desert elect five non-partisan council members who serve four-year staggered terms, with elections occurring every two years. Currently the Palm Desert city council is elected through City Council Districts The position of mayor is non-elected and rotates annually among the members of the city council. The council serves to pass ordinances, approve budgets, and hire the city manager and city attorney. The city manager oversees administrative operations and the appointment of department heads.

In the California State Legislature, Palm Desert is in the 19th senatorial district, represented by Republican Rosilicie Ochoa Bogh, and in the 47th Assembly district, represented by Republican Greg Wallis.

In the United States House of Representatives, Palm Desert is in California's 41st congressional district, represented by Republican Ken Calvert.

=== Public safety ===
The Riverside County Sheriff's Department provides law enforcement services to the city through the Palm Desert Sheriff's Station located on Gerald Ford Drive. The Palm Desert Station also administers contract police services to the municipalities of Rancho Mirage, Indian Wells, as well as the surrounding unincorporated areas.

The city of Palm Desert contracts for fire and paramedic services with the Riverside County Fire Department through a cooperative agreement with CAL FIRE. Palm Desert currently has three fire stations, which are Station 33 (Town Center), Station 67 (Mesa View), and Station 71 (North Palm Desert). Each fire station provides an engine company and a paramedic ambulance. Fire station 33 also has a truck company.

== Education ==
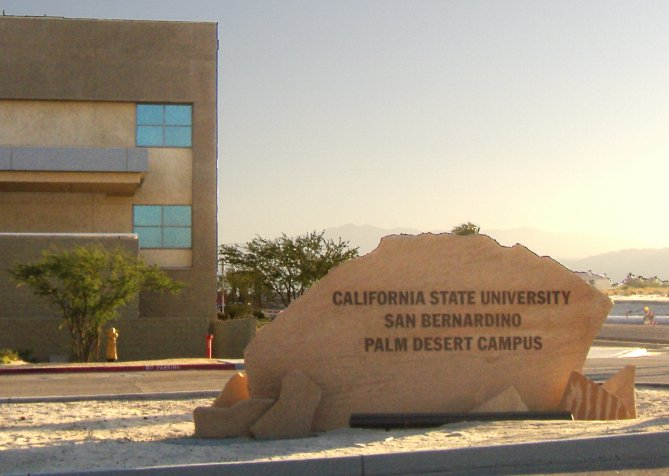
CSUSB Palm Desert Campus

Palm Desert is the site for the main campus of College of the Desert, a community college, which originally opened in 1962. The University of California, Riverside also has an extension learning center in the city.

California State University, San Bernardino first opened its Palm Desert campus in 1986, followed by its own stand-alone 169-acre (68 ha) campus located on Cook Street in 2002. The Palm Desert Campus offers over 40 undergraduate, graduate, doctorate, and credential programs on site and online as the only full-service public school of higher education in the Coachella Valley.

The primary high school is Palm Desert High School (with 2,200 students) which is part of the Desert Sands Unified School District. The main middle school (with 1,100 students) is Palm Desert Middle School, a charter school. The four elementary schools in the city are George Washington Charter, Abraham Lincoln, James Carter and Ronald Reagan. The northernmost part of Palm Desert is served by the Palm Springs Unified School District, so the students can attend Rancho Mirage High School in Rancho Mirage, or Nellie Coffman Middle School and Cathedral City High School in Cathedral City, California. Some students in the eastside are zoned to La Quinta High School and Colonel Mitchell Paige Middle School.

The Riverside County Department of Education operates San Cayetano Community School, a grade 1 to 12 educational facility. There are eight private schools in the immediate area: Desert Adventist Academy, Palm Desert Presbyterian School, Sacred Heart Catholic Academy, The Palm Valley School, the Learning Tree Academy, Xavier College Preparatory High School (Catholic-Jesuit), the Hope Academy, and the Desert Torah Academy, a Jewish community school and its social recreational Jewish Community Center. It also has meetings by the Jewish Federation of the Desert based in Palm Springs, serving an estimated 35,000 Jewish people in the Coachella Valley.

== Infrastructure ==
=== Utilities ===
Electricity in Palm Desert is served by Southern California Edison. Water is provided by the Coachella Valley Water District.

=== Transportation ===
Modern transportation services include:

- Palm Springs International Airport is the closest commercial airport and serves Palm Springs and the Coachella Valley.
  - Historical note: during World War II it was operated as the Palm Springs Army Airfield.
- SunLine Transit Agency provides bus service in the Coachella Valley.

Highways include:

I-10 – Interstate 10 runs to the north of the city with access through the Monterey Avenue, Cook Street, and Washington Street exits.
SR 74 – The Pines to Palms Scenic Byway (California State Route 74) runs from the coast, over the San Jacinto Mountains and has its eastern terminus at Highway 111 in Palm Desert before continuing northbound as Monterey Avenue.
SR 111 – California State Route 111, which passes through the city.

=== Parks ===
Palm Desert has 14 city parks:

- Cahuilla Hills Park
- Cap Homme/ Ralph Adams Park
- Civic Center Park
- Community Gardens
- Freedom Park
- Hovley Soccer Park
- Ironwood Park
- Joe Mann Park
- Magnesia Falls City Park
- Palm Desert Dog Park
- Palma Village Park
- University Dog Park
- University Park East
- Washington Charter School Park

To the south of Palm Desert is the Santa Rosa and San Jacinto Mountains National Monument, and to the north of Palm Desert is the Coachella Valley National Wildlife Refuge.

=== Cemeteries ===
The Desert Memorial Park in Cathedral City is maintained by the Palm Springs Cemetery District. Also in Cathedral City is the Forest Lawn Cemetery, maintained by Forest Lawn Memorial-Parks & Mortuaries.

== Culture ==
- Desert ARC Italian Festival
- Greek Festival
- Armenian Festival
- CanadaFest
- Scottish Festival

== Attractions ==
- Palm Desert
  - College of the Desert
  - Philip L. Boyd Deep Canyon Desert Research Center, a unit of the University of California Natural Reserve System
  - Living Desert Zoo and Gardens
  - McCallum Theatre
  - Circle of Land and Sky temporary art installation by Phillip K. Smith III, part of the inaugural Desert X
- Surrounding communities
  - Children's Discovery Museum of the Desert in Rancho Mirage.
  - Indian Wells Tennis Garden in Indian Wells.

== Notable people ==
Many celebrities keep homes in Palm Desert, including Rita Rudner and more recently, the current home of professional golfer Michelle Wie and one of the homes of Bill Gates. Legendary actress Anne Francis resided in a condominium until July 2000. Film producer Jerry Weintraub called it his second home before he died. Artist Phillip K. Smith III calls Palm Desert home and his studio is in Palm Desert.

The city is home to the Palm Desert Scene, a musical genre that has been heavily influential internationally since the early 1990s. Many of the Palm Desert bands are credited for starting the rock/metal subgenre known as stoner rock. Bands including Queens of the Stone Age, Kyuss, Fu Manchu and Eagles of Death Metal have become well known rock bands.

== Sister cities ==
Palm Desert had been in the sister cities program, as designated by Sister Cities International. Six to nine cities that are or were associated with Palm Desert:

- Wollongong, New South Wales, Australia
- Osoyoos, British Columbia, Canada
- Haifa, Israel
- La Paz, Baja California Sur, Mexico
- Gisborne, New Zealand
- Port Moresby, Papua New Guinea
- Port Elizabeth, South Africa
- Zihuatanejo, Guerrero, Mexico

Palm Desert has a community exchange program with

- Ketchikan, Alaska

Also a community exchange relationship with the major city of Concepcion, Chile.

== See also ==
- List of public art in Palm Desert, California
- St. Margaret's Episcopal Church
