= Desert Sands Unified School District =

Public school district in Riverside County, California

Address
- 47-950 Dune Palms Road La Quinta, California, 92253; United States
- Coordinates: 33°42′08″N 116°16′35″W

District information
- Type: Public
- Mottoes: The Future is Here
- Grades: K–12
- Established: 1964
- Superintendent: Kelly May-Vollmar, Ed.D (as of 2022)
- Schools: 20 elementary schools, 8 middle schools, 4 high schools, 2 continuation high schools, an alternative education school, and 2 preschool programs.
- NCES District ID: 0611110

Students and staff
- Students: 26,982 (2020–2021)
- Teachers: 1,090.02 (FTE)
- Staff: 1,288.62 (FTE)
- Student–teacher ratio: 24.75:1

Other information
- Website: Official website

The Desert Sands Unified School District (DSUSD) is a public school district with main offices located in La Quinta, California. The district was founded in 1964, after voters approved the consolidation of all Indio public schools. As of 2017, DSUSD serves 28,958 students in Indio, La Quinta, Palm Desert, Indian Wells, Bermuda Dunes, and parts of Rancho Mirage and Coachella.

== History ==
In the 1930s and 1940s, Indio Public Schools consisted of Washington, Roosevelt, Jackson, Lincoln and Hoover schools, with the Jefferson school the sole junior high-level facility. In 1966, voters approved the consolidation of the Indio Elementary School District and the Coachella Valley Joint Union High School District, with some smaller elementary districts, into one, 760 square mile, district called Desert Sands Unified School District. The district initially served about 6,600 students.

In 2010, using funds provided by the Magnet Schools Assistance Program, two elementary schools were converted to magnet schools: the Carrillo Ranch Elementary Visual and Performing Arts Magnet School and the John F. Kennedy Elementary Math and Science Magnet School.

In 2016, the school district celebrated its 50th anniversary with an exhibit at the Coachella Valley History Museum, a former one-room school house built in 1909.

In 2016-2017, Desert Sands began offering full-day Kindergarten at all schools (except for Washington Charter) in order to help prepare students and increase reading and writing skills. The expansion was funded by the district's Local Control and Accountability Plan.

In 2017, Students in the Desert Sands Unified School District outperformed the other Coachella Valley school districts on statewide tests.

In the 2018-19 school year, the school district launched a new One to World device initiative titled Connect. Chromebooks are used district-wide for grades 2-12 and the devices are being issued each year alongside textbooks. Students needing a wifi connection at home can also be issued a mifi device to connect to the district's network.

== Schools ==
DSUSD has 20 elementary schools, 8 middle schools, 4 high schools, 2 continuation high schools, an alternative education school, and 2 preschool programs.

=== Elementary schools ===
- Carrillo Ranch Elementary School, Indio – opened in 2003/04.
- James E. Carter Elementary School, Palm Desert – opened in 1996/97.
- Dr. Reynaldo J. Carreon Jr. Academy, Indio – opened in 2004/05.
- Amelia Earhart Elementary of International Studies, an IB World School, Indio – opened in 2001/02.
- Gerald Ford Elementary School, Indian Wells – opened in 1991/92.
- Benjamin Franklin Elementary School, an IB World School, La Quinta – opened in 1997/98.
- Herbert Hoover Elementary School, Indio – opened in 1951/52.
- Horizon School of Independent Studies, La Quinta.
- Andrew Jackson Elementary School, Indio – opened in 1954/55.
- Lyndon B. Johnson Elementary School, Indio – opened January 2000.
- John F. Kennedy Elementary School, Indio – opened in 1964/65.
- Abraham Lincoln Elementary School, Palm Desert – opened in 1965/66.
- James Madison Elementary School, Indio – opened in 1988/89.
- James Monroe Elementary School, Bermuda Dunes – opened in 1987/88.
- Richard R. Oliphant Elementary School, Indio – opened in 2018/19.
- Ronald Reagan Elementary School, Palm Desert – opened in 2006/07.
- Theodore Roosevelt Elementary School, Indio – opened in 1950/51, oldest elementary school in Indio.
- Harry S. Truman Elementary School, La Quinta – opened in 1989/90.
- Martin Van Buren Elementary School, Indio – opened in 1958/59 renovated.
- George Washington Charter Elementary School, Palm Desert – opened in 1954/55.

=== Middle schools ===
- Indio Middle School, Indio – opened in 1991/92.
- John Glenn Middle School of International Studies, an IB World School, Indio – opened in 2001/02.
- La Quinta Middle STEM Academy, La Quinta – opened in 1988/89 in portables. Permanent building opened 1990/91.
- Palm Desert Charter Middle School, Palm Desert – opened in 1978/79.
- Thomas Jefferson Middle School, Indio – the building was a grade school since 1926 and a grade 3–8 school from 1995–2006.
- Colonel Mitchell Paige Middle School, La Quinta – opened in 2005/06.
- Horizon School of Independent Studies, La Quinta.
- Desert Ridge Academy, Indio – opened 2009/10.

=== High schools ===
- La Quinta High School – opened in 1994/95.
- Indio High School, Indio – opened in 1958/59.
- Palm Desert High School, Palm Desert – opened in 1985/86.
- Amistad High School, Indio – continuation, opened in 1988/89.
- Horizon School of Independent Studies, La Quinta – opened in 2001/02.
- Summit High School, La Quinta – continuation, opened in 2004/05.
- Shadow Hills High School, Indio – opened 2009/10.

=== Other schools ===
- Desert Sands Adult School – online classes.
- John Adams Early Childhood Learning Center.
- Dwight Eisenhower Community Education Center - preschool programs, career technical education, adult education.
- Desert Sands High School -new high school to open in 2008
- Desert Sunrise High School -continuation

=== Closed schools ===
- Woodrow Wilson Middle School, Indio - opened in 1964/65 in Indio, closed at the end of the 2009 school year. It was replaced by Amistad High School
- Dwight Eisenhower Elementary School opened in N/A in Indio, closed at the end of the 2017 school year. It was replaced by Richard Oliphant Elementary School

=== Proposed Schools ===
- North Indio High-Middle School
- Indian Wells High School, in La Quinta
- Youngs Lane Elementary School, in Indio
- Country Club Elementary School, in Bermuda Dunes.
- Carver Elementary School, in Bermuda Dunes.
