= Indio High School =

Public high school in California, United States

Location
- 81750 Avenue 46, Indio, California 92201; 33°42′47″N 116°14′25″W

Information
- Type: Public
- Established: 1958
- Superintendent: Kelly May-Vollmar, Ed.D (as of 2022)
- Principal: Monica Rodriguez
- Teaching staff: 85.01 (FTE)
- Grades: 9th - 12th
- Years offered: 4
- Enrollment: 2,027 (2023-2024)
- Student to teacher ratio: 23.84
- Schedule type: A/B block schedule
- Color
- Mascot: Mr Rajah
- Newspaper: Sandscripts
- Yearbook: The Rajahan
- Website: ihs.dsusd.us

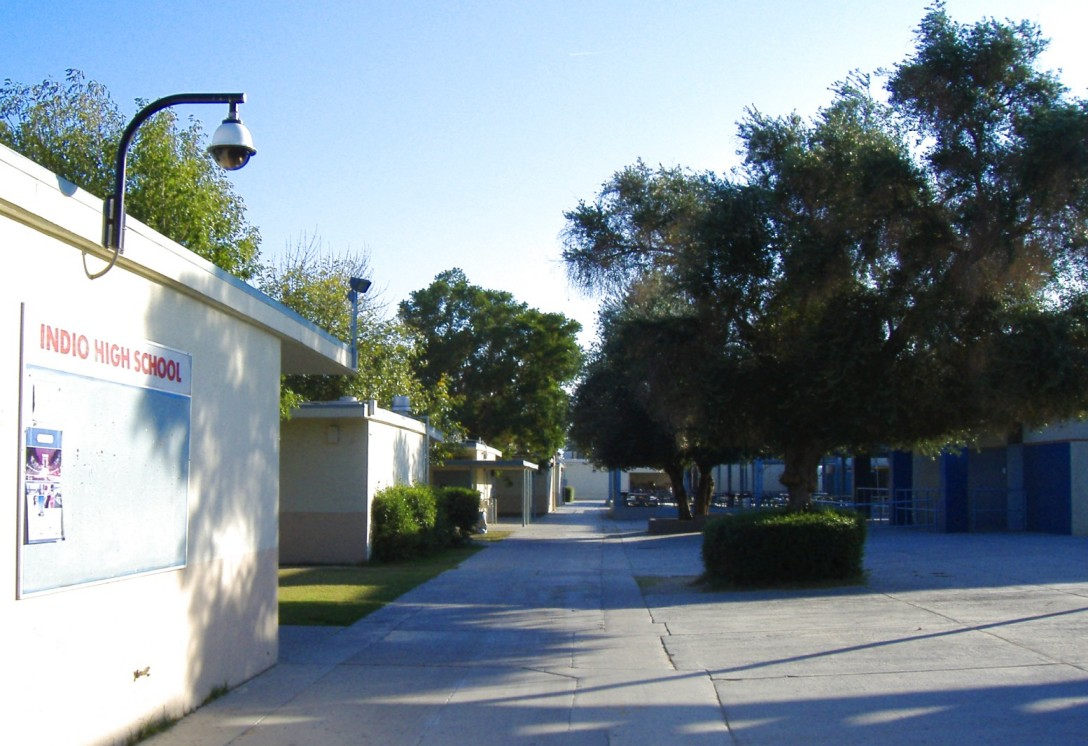
A typical day at Indio High School before renovation in the 2010s.

Indio High School is a public high school for grades 9–12. It is located in Indio, California and has a current enrollment of about 2,090 students. Its mascot is a Rajah (an Indian prince). The school is part of the Desert Sands Unified School District. Indio High School has one of the largest student pupil populations of any California high school. It once had a 60-square-mile (160 km^{2}) school boundary area until 1985, but still serves all of Indio, as well parts of La Quinta and accepts intradistrict waivers for Coachella residents. Its feeder schools are Indio Middle School and Jefferson Middle School, which are both located in the city.

== History ==
Indio High School was founded in 1958, as the third high school in the Coachella Valley and the first in the city of Indio. The school newspaper is called Sandscripts. School graduates continuing their education at college have recently improved to 75 percent in 2006, up from 23 percent in 1995 . It was the only high school for DSUSD students in the 9th to 12th grade level, until Palm Desert High School opened its doors in 1985/86 and then La Quinta High School in 1994/95 which have a large share of Indio residents who can attend there by school district policy. A new high school, Shadow Hills in the northern half of Indio will decrease the number of students in the 2009/10 school year. In the 2009/10 school year Desert Sands was deciding whether to close the school at the end of the 2009/10 school year, due to low Standardized Test scores. That year the scores went up dramatically and the board instead voted to renovate the school, which was approved. The School was featured in a video for success 101, a course for freshmen entering high school to help them transition from middle to high school. Freshman students, faculty, and teachers of the 2010/11 school year were followed all school year to see how the class had helped them. For the 2011/12 school year the school moved from a six-period day schedule to an eight-period A/B Block schedule. This was done to give the students more electives and also so they would have opportunities to get more credits. On May 1, 2013 at 8:52, there was a fire at the boy's locker room coaches office. Firefighters took out the fire in about a half an hour.

== Indio High School Renovation ==
Indio High School, along with other schools in Desert Sands Unified School District, was completely rebuilt in several phases between 2010 and ultimately completed for the 2017 school year. The renovation included a new gymnasium, baseball and softball fields, cafeteria, four classroom wings, an Administration building, and a Performing Arts Center.

== Athletics ==
- Boys/Girls Basketball
- Football
- Wrestling
- Boys/Girls Volleyball
- Swimming
- Waterpolo
- Baseball
- Softball
- Soccer
- Tennis
- Marching Band
- Golf
- Cross Country
- Track and Field
- Color Guard/Winter Guard
- Cheerleading
- Dance

Indio High School has won 14 CIF Championships:

- Football-1979, 1981
- Men's Swimming-1979
- Women's Basketball-1984
- Men's Tennis-1983, 1985
- Women's Tennis-1985
- Waterpolo-1977
- Women's Volleyball-1983
- Wrestling-1983, 1984, 1991, 1992, 1993

== Notable alumni ==
- Guy Baker, U.S. Olympic Waterpolo Coach,
- Jack Blades, musician
- Lincoln A. Castellanos, actor
- Cameron Crowe, screenwriter and director
- Debi Derryberry, voice actress
- Rigoberto González, literary writer
- Oscar Lua, football player, Developer
- Vanessa Marcil, actress
- Tom Martin, television writer
- Tony Reagins, Los Angeles Angels of Anaheim former General Manager
- Marco Sanchez, actor
- Ed White, football player

== Indio High School in popular culture ==
Indio High School has been mentioned in the lyrics of songs and has been featured in music videos.

The Desert Sessions song "Winners" contains an audio sample of a man reading out the names from Indio High School. The names listed in the song "Winners" were real Indio High School students. The song "Interpretive Reading," on the same album as "Winners", features a choir singing the school's alma mater song in the background.

There was a hip-hop single titled "Indio Rydaz" on YouTube released by Lil' Tweety, an Indio High School alumni from the class of 2004.
