= Daniel Whelan =

Irish gridiron football player (born 1999)

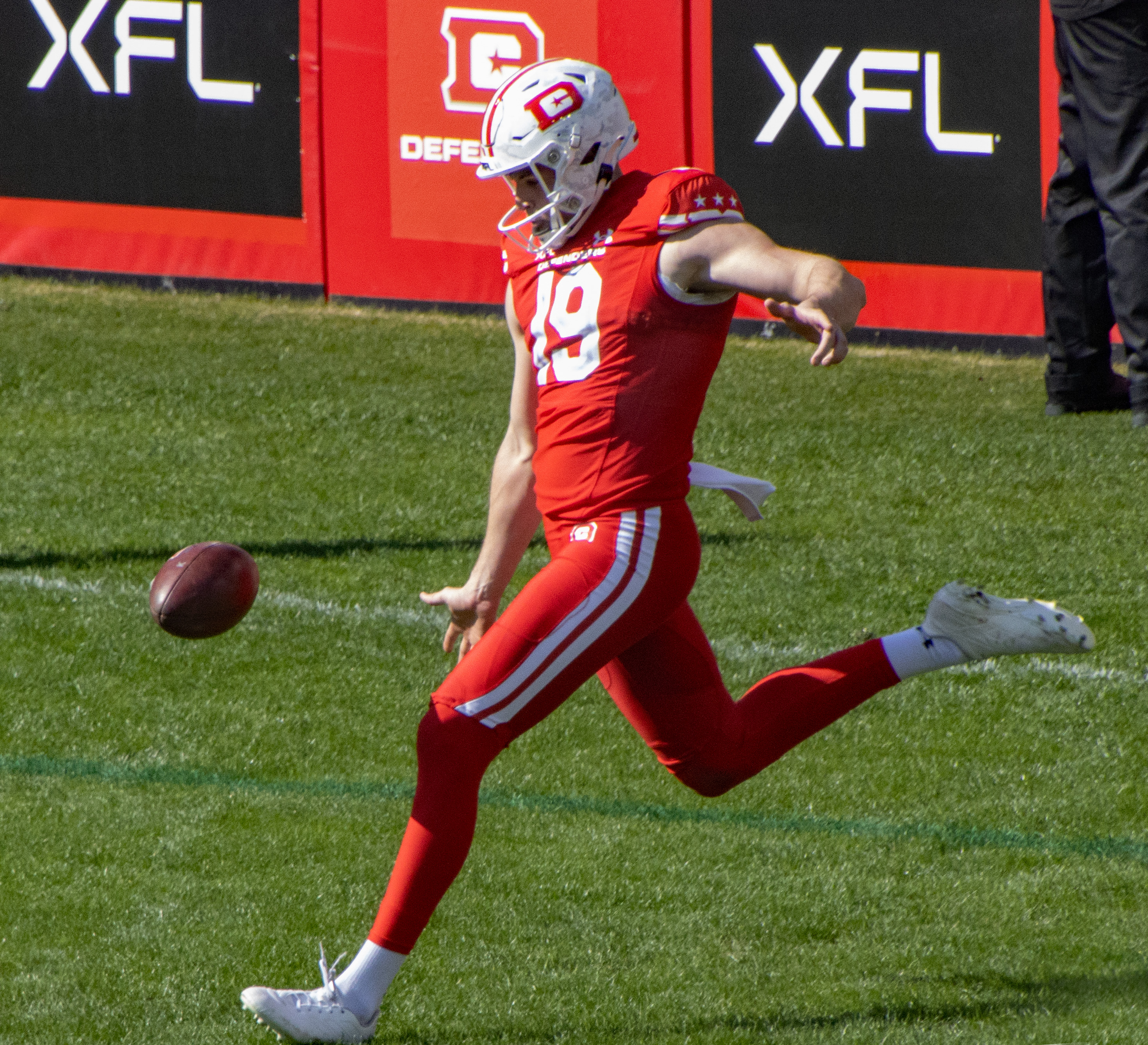
- Whelan with the DC Defenders in 2023

No. 19 – Green Bay Packers
- Position: Punter
- Roster status: Active

Personal information
- Born: 10 February 1999 (age 27); Enniskerry, County Wicklow, Ireland
- Listed height: 6 ft 5 in (1.96 m)
- Listed weight: 216 lb (98 kg)

Career information
- High school: Rancho Mirage (Rancho Mirage, California, U.S.)
- College: UC Davis (2017–2021)
- NFL draft: 2022: undrafted

Career history
- New Orleans Saints (2022)*; DC Defenders (2023); Green Bay Packers (2023–present)
- * Offseason or practice squad member only

Awards and highlights
- All-XFL Team (2023)

Career NFL statistics as of Week 10, 2026
- Punts: 202
- Punt yards: 9,730
- Punt average: 48.2
- Net punting average: 41.6
- Inside 20: 74
- Longest punt: 75
- Stats at Pro Football Reference

Daniel Whelan (born 10 February 1999) is an Irish professional American football punter for the Green Bay Packers of the National Football League (NFL). He played college football for the UC Davis Aggies and was signed by the New Orleans Saints as an undrafted free agent in 2022. He has also played for the DC Defenders of the XFL.

== Early life ==
Whelan was born on 10 February 1999, in Enniskerry, County Wicklow, Ireland, and grew up there. He moved to the United States at age 13, settling in California. He initially played association football (soccer) before switching to American football as a junior at Rancho Mirage High School. He also played tennis in high school. He committed to play college football for the UC Davis Aggies following his time at Rancho Mirage. He is an avid Newcastle United fan as his father is a Geordie.

== College career ==
As a true freshman at UC Davis in 2017, Whelan played five games, totaling 10 punts for 440 yards. The following year, he appeared in all 13 games while posting 67 punts for 2,756 yards (a 41.1 average), earning honorable mention all-conference honors. Whelan was named third-team all-conference in 2019 while having a 44.1 punting average on 57 kicks.

In the 2021 spring season (postponed from 2020 due to COVID-19), Whelan punted 17 times for 815 yards, a Big Sky Conference-leading 47.9 yard average, earning four first-team All-American selections, a first-team all-conference selection, and being named a finalist for the FCS Punter of the Year Award. He handled both punting and kickoff duties in his final year, the fall 2021 season, earning All-Big Sky and second-team All-American honors with a school single-season record 46.25 punting average (his 47.9 average in the prior season did not qualify for the leaderboards due to him having not enough punts). He finished his stint at UC Davis with 151 punts for 6,523 yards, having the school all-time record with a 44.01 career punting average.

== Professional career ==
Pre-draft measurables
Height	Weight	Arm length	Hand span	Wingspan	40-yard dash	10-yard split	20-yard split	Vertical jump	Broad jump
6 ft 5 1/8 in (1.96 m)	216 lb (98 kg)	33 in (0.84 m)	9 3/8 in (0.24 m)	6 ft 7 1/2 in (2.02 m)	4.74 s	1.69 s	2.51 s	30.5 in (0.77 m)	10 ft 1 in (3.07 m)
All values from Pro Day

=== New Orleans Saints ===
After going unselected in the 2022 NFL draft, Whelan was signed by the New Orleans Saints as an undrafted free agent. He was waived on 26 July 2022.

=== DC Defenders ===
Whelan was selected by the DC Defenders of the XFL with the second pick of the specialists phase in the 2023 XFL draft. He made the team and served as their punter in all 10 of their games as they went on to be league championship runner-ups, being named All-XFL after having an average of 45.6 yards on 29 attempts.

=== Green Bay Packers ===
On 17 May 2023, Whelan signed with the Green Bay Packers after his time in the XFL, eventually beating out the incumbent Pat O'Donnell for the Packers' punting job. He made his NFL debut on 10 September 2023, against the Chicago Bears, recording five punts for 249 yards while becoming the first Irish-born NFL player since the retirement of Neil O'Donoghue in 1985. After the 2023 season, he was offered a tender.

On 4 September 2025, Whelan signed a two-year, $7 million contract extension with the Packers.

== NFL career statistics ==
Legend
**Bold**	Career high

=== Regular season ===
Year	Team	GP	Punting				
Year	Team	GP	Punts	Yards	Avg	Lng	Blk
2023	GB	17	**57**	2,634	46.2	68	0
2024	GB	17	56	**2,582**	46.1	**74**	0
2025	GB	17	49	2,533	**51.7**	72	0
2026	GB	10	40	1,981	49.5	75	0
Career		61	202	9,730	48.2	75	0
Source: pro-football-reference.com

=== Postseason ===
Year	Team	GP	Punting				
Year	Team	GP	Punts	Yards	Avg	Lng	Blk
2023	GB	**2**	**4**	155	38.8	42	0
2024	GB	1	2	100	**50.0**	50	0
2025	GB	1	**4**	**195**	48.8	**58**	0
Career		4	10	450	45.0	58	0
Source: pro-football-reference.com
