= Coachella (disambiguation) =

Coachella is an annual music and arts festival in California.

Coachella may also refer to:

- Coachella, California, a city in the United States
- Coachella Valley, where the city in California is located
- Coachella Canal, in California
- "Coachella – Woodstock in My Mind", a 2017 song by Lana Del Rey and Rick Nowels.

== See also ==
- Coachella Valley (disambiguation)
