= Tyson Miller =

American baseball player (born 1995)

Free agent
- Pitcher
- Born: July 29, 1995 (age 31); Fairfield, California, U.S.
- Bats: Right Throws: Right

MLB debut
- August 17, 2020, for the Chicago Cubs

MLB statistics (through 2024 season)
- Win–loss record: 7–3
- Earned run average: 3.87
- Strikeouts: 72
- Stats at Baseball Reference

Teams
- Chicago Cubs (2020); Texas Rangers (2022); Milwaukee Brewers (2023); Los Angeles Dodgers (2023); New York Mets (2023); Los Angeles Dodgers (2023); Seattle Mariners (2024); Chicago Cubs (2024)

Tyson Marcus Miller (born July 29, 1995) is an American professional baseball pitcher who is a free agent. He has previously played in Major League Baseball (MLB) for the Chicago Cubs, Texas Rangers, Milwaukee Brewers, Los Angeles Dodgers, New York Mets, and Seattle Mariners.

== Career ==
=== Amateur career ===
Miller attended Shadow Hills High School in Indio, California. In 2013, as a senior, he has a 6–0 win–loss record with a 0.19 earned run average (ERA) as a pitcher for the school's baseball team. He was not drafted in the 2013 MLB draft, and enrolled at California Baptist University, where he played college baseball. In 2014, his freshman year, he appeared in 13 games (ten starts), going 7–1 with a 2.63 ERA, and in 2015, as a sophomore, he went 7–3 with a 3.32 ERA in 14 games (13 starts), earning a spot on the Pacific West Conference Second Team. After the 2015 season, he played collegiate summer baseball with the Brewster Whitecaps of the Cape Cod Baseball League. As a junior in 2017, Miller pitched to a 9–3 record with a 2.27 ERA in 16 games (15 starts). He was named to the PacWest First Team.

=== Chicago Cubs ===
After the season, he was drafted by the Chicago Cubs in the fourth round of the 2016 MLB draft. Miller signed with Chicago and spent his first professional season with the Arizona League Cubs and Eugene Emeralds, going 2–1 with a 3.14 ERA in 28 2/3 innings.

In 2017, Miller spent the season with the South Bend Cubs, pitching to a 6–7 record and a 4.48 ERA in 28 games (twenty starts), and 2018 with the Myrtle Beach Pelicans, going 9–9 with a 3.54 ERA in 23 starts.

In 2019, Miller started the season with the Tennessee Smokies and was promoted to the Iowa Cubs in July. Over 26 starts between both teams, Miller went 7–8 with a 4.35 ERA, striking out 123 over 136 2/3 innings. Following the season, he was added to Chicago's 40-man roster.

On August 17, 2020, Miller was promoted to the major leagues, and made his MLB debut that day against the St. Louis Cardinals, pitching two innings and giving up two runs. He finished his rookie season with a 5.40 ERA in two games.

Miller was assigned to the Triple-A Iowa Cubs to begin the 2021 season. He struggled to a 5.06 ERA before being designated for assignment on May 30, 2021.

=== Texas Rangers ===
On June 4, 2021, Miller was claimed off waivers by the Texas Rangers. He was assigned to the Triple-A Round Rock Express, and made one appearance for the team, allowing two runs in three innings of work. On June 18, Miller was designated for assignment without appearing in a game for Texas. He was outrighted on June 20.

On June 10, 2022, Texas selected Miller's contract as a COVID-19 replacement player. In his only appearance, against the Houston Astros, Miller took the loss after allowing six runs on four hits and two walks in two-thirds of an inning. On June 15, he was removed from the 40-man roster and returned to Triple-A Round Rock. He had his contract selected on September 11. On September 27, Miller relieved Jesús Tinoco in a game against the Seattle Mariners, and tossed 3 2/3 scoreless innings to earn his first career win.

=== Milwaukee Brewers ===
On November 11, 2022, Miller was claimed off waivers by the Milwaukee Brewers. Miller was optioned to the Triple-A Nashville Sounds to begin the 2023 season. In seven games for Milwaukee, he logged a 5.79 ERA with seven strikeouts in 9 1/3 innings of work. On July 8, 2023, Miller was designated for assignment by the Brewers.

=== Los Angeles Dodgers ===
On July 12, 2023, Miller was traded to the Los Angeles Dodgers in exchange for cash considerations. He pitched in one game for the Dodgers and two games for the Triple–A Oklahoma City Dodgers before he was designated for assignment on August 2.

=== New York Mets ===
On August 4, 2023, Miller was claimed off waivers by the New York Mets. Miller made only one appearance for the team, tossing two scoreless innings against the Pittsburgh Pirates. On August 23, the Mets designated Miller for assignment.

=== Los Angeles Dodgers (second stint) ===
On August 27, 2023, Miller was claimed off waivers by the Dodgers. He appeared in one game during this stint with the team, pitching two scoreless innings against the Arizona Diamondbacks on August 29 before being designated for assignment again the next day. Miller cleared waivers and was sent outright to Triple–A on September 1. Between his two stints with Oklahoma City in 2023, he appeared in nine games and allowed three runs in 16 innings. On October 4, Miller elected free agency.

=== Seattle Mariners ===
On November 10, 2023, Miller signed a minor league contract with the Seattle Mariners. After four appearances for the Triple–A Tacoma Rainiers, he was selected to the major league roster on April 8, 2024. In 9 games for Seattle, Miller logged a 3.09 ERA with 12 strikeouts across 11 2/3 innings pitched. On May 10, Miller was designated for assignment by Seattle.

=== Chicago Cubs (second stint) ===
On May 13, 2024, the Mariners traded Miller to the Chicago Cubs in exchange for third baseman Jake Slaughter. In 49 appearances out of the bullpen for Chicago, he compiled a 5-1 record and 2.15 ERA with 42 strikeouts and one save across 50 1/3 innings pitched.

Miller began the 2025 campaign on the injured list due to a hip impingement. He was transferred to the 60-day injured list on May 13, 2025. On June 5, Miller was activated from the injured list and subsequently designated for assignment. He cleared waivers and was sent outright to the Triple-A Iowa Cubs on June 11. Miller elected free agency on October 3.

=== Chicago White Sox ===
On January 15, 2026, Miller signed a minor league contract with the Chicago White Sox. He made six appearances for the Triple-A Charlotte Knights, but struggled to a 12.96 ERA with nine strikeouts across 8 1/3 innings pitched. Miller was released by the White Sox organization on April 23.

=== Piratas de Campeche ===
On July 17, 2026, Miller signed with the Piratas de Campeche of the Mexican League. In nine relief appearances, he posted a 1–0 record with a 2.00 ERA and nine strikeouts in nine innings pitched. On September 3, 2026, Miller was released by Campeche.
