= Yucca Valley High School =

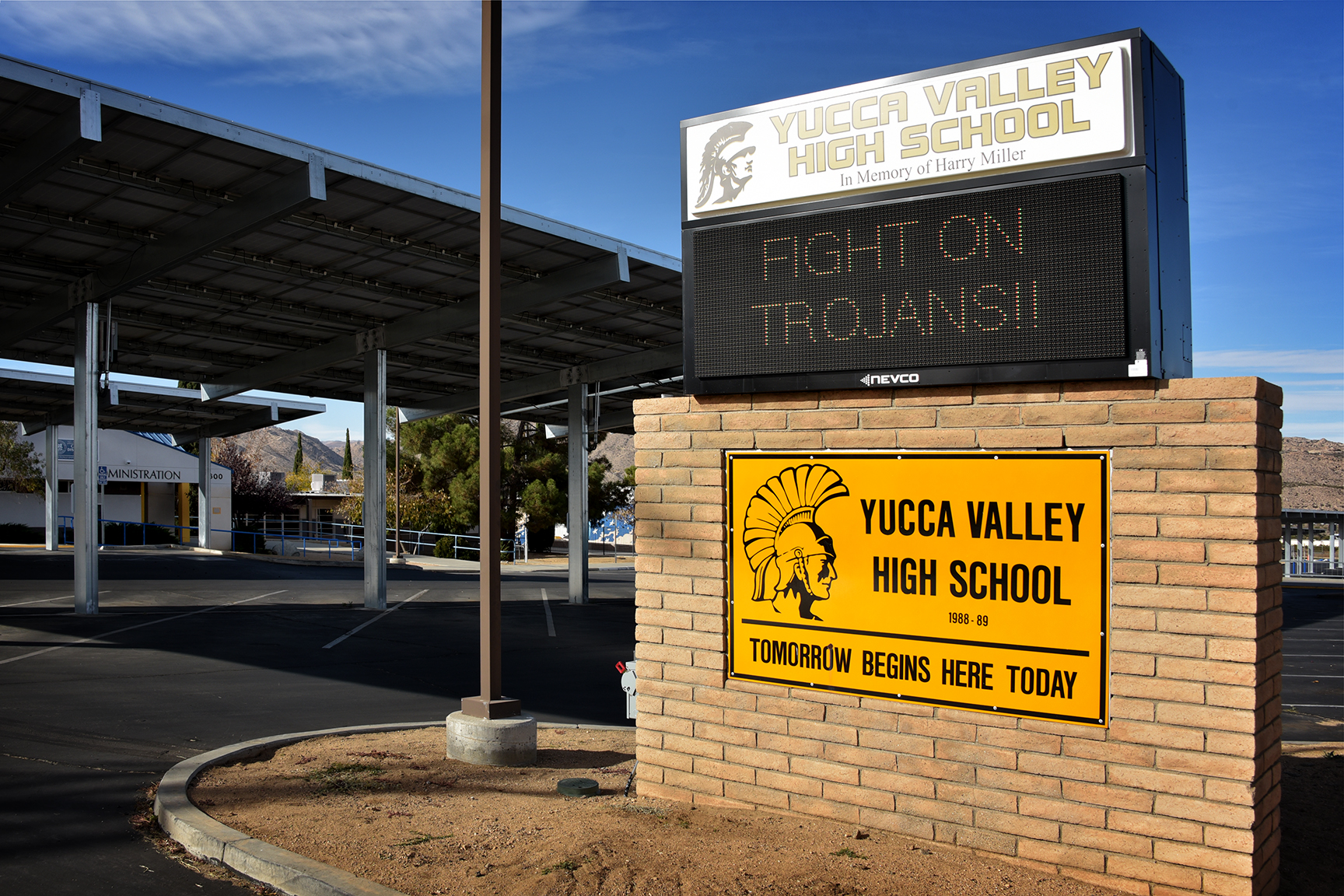
- Yucca Valley High School sign in 2017

Location
- 7600 Sage Avenue, Yucca Valley, California 92284; 34°06′50″N 116°25′30″W

Information
- Type: Public
- Established: 1969
- Principal: Justin Monical
- Teaching staff: 59.14 (FTE)
- Enrollment: 1,271 (2023–2024)
- Student to teacher ratio: 21.49
- Colors: Black, gold, and white
- Nickname: Trojans
- Website: morongo.k12.ca.us/o/yvhs

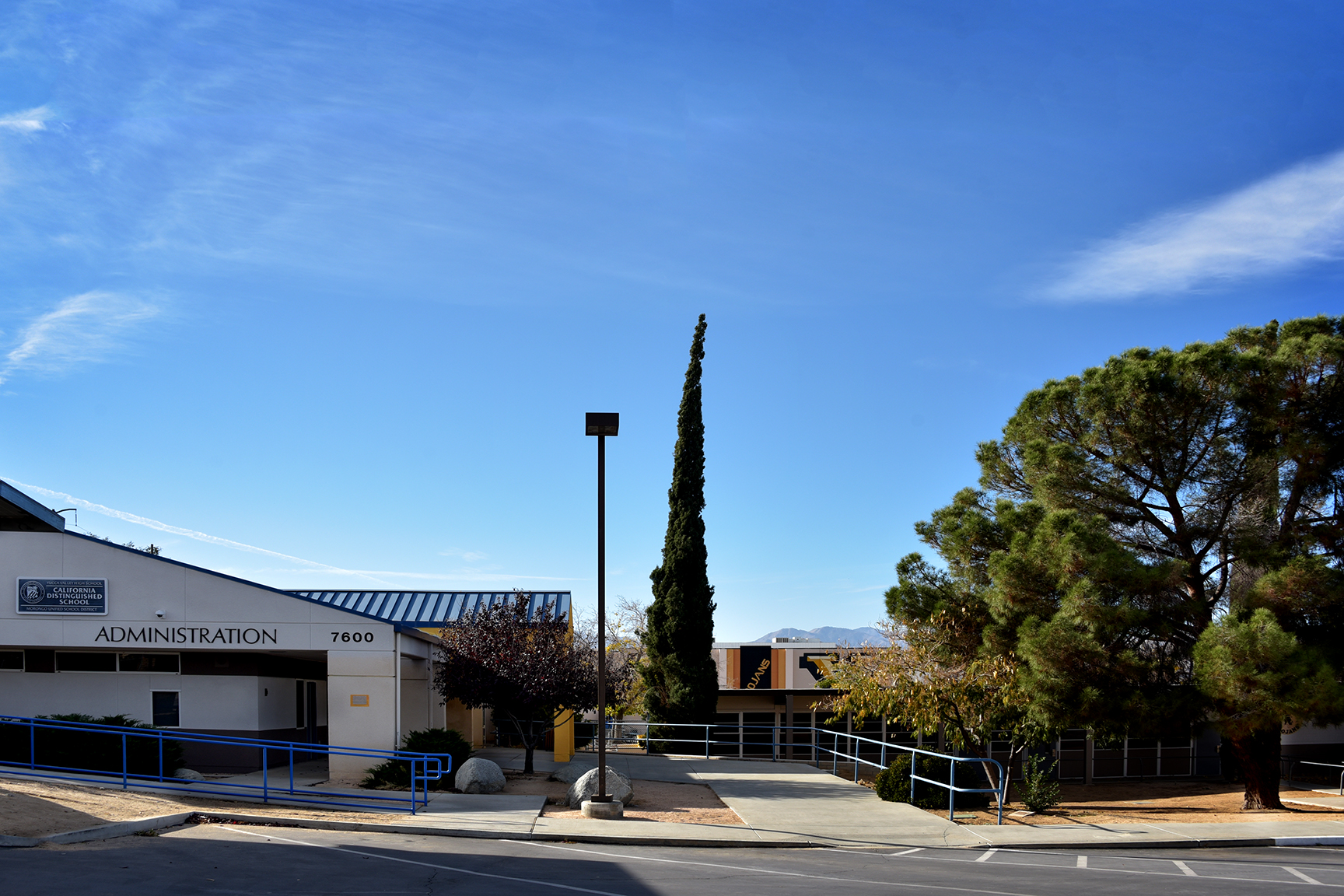
Yucca Valley High School

Yucca Valley High School is in the town of Yucca Valley, California. The school has 1,690 students in grades 9–12. The school is part of the Morongo Unified School District.

== Athletics ==
Yucca Valley High School is part of the Desert Valley League. Athletic programs include boys’ and girls' tennis, wrestling, and cross country running.
