= Desert Valley League =

American high school sports league

The Desert Valley League is an American high school sports league primarily within the Coachella Valley of Riverside County, California, with some schools from surrounding areas. The league is affiliated with the CIF Southern Section.

As of the 2024 season, teams in the league include:

- Coachella Valley High School Mighty Arabs
- Indio High School Rajahs
- Twentynine Palms High School Wildcats
- Yucca Valley High School Trojans
