= Rancho Mirage High School =

Location
- 31001 Rattler Road; Rancho Mirage, California 92270; United States; 33.8212°N 116.4333°W

Information
- Type: Public
- Established: 2013
- Principal: Brian Hendra
- Teaching staff: 68.59 (FTE)
- Enrollment: 1,401 (2024-2025)
- Student to teacher ratio: 20.43
- Colors: Maroon, gray, and Columbia blue
- Nickname: Rattlers
- Information: (760) 202 6455
- Website: RMHS Home Page

Rancho Mirage High School is a secondary school located in Rancho Mirage, California. The school is a part of the Palm Springs Unified School District.

Rancho Mirage High School was founded in 2013. RMHS is a comprehensive high school offering college preparatory classes along with programs in automotive repair, culinary arts, technical theater, AVID, Honors and Advanced Placement classes. For the 2019–2020 school year, there were 1,524 students in grades 9 through 12. The majority of students at Rancho Mirage High School come from James Workman Middle School and Nellie N. Coffman Middle School, both in Cathedral City.

In Sports, their football and basketball teams play other teams belonging to the Desert Empire League and some teams from the Desert Valley League. Their junior varsity and varsity football teams play in Dr. Jerry Argovitz Football Stadium on the RMHS campus, dedicated to the PSUSD sports institute official.

In the Performing Arts Technical Theater 1 out of the 4 programs at Rancho Mirage High School is located in Helene Galen Performing Arts Center as well as other District programs such as the Musical Theater University. The Helene Galen Performing Arts Center is located on the RMHS campus

Rancho Mirage High School is one of four PSUSD schools that reside on section 14 of the Agua Caliente Indian Reservation

== Representation in government ==
District

In the Palm Springs Board of Education Rancho Mirage High School is in 3rd District, Represented by Independent Karen Cornett

City

In the Rancho Mirage City Council the city council is elected at large

County

In the Riverside County Board of Supervisors, Rancho Mirage High School is in 4th District, Represented by Democrat V. Manuel Perez Supervisor of the 4th District

State

In the California State Legislature, Rancho Mirage High School is in the 19th Senate District, represented by Republican Rosilicie Ochoa Bogh, and in the 47th State Assembly District, represented by Republican Greg Wallis.

Tribal

In the Agua Caliente Tribal Council the Tribal Council is also elected at large like the Rancho Mirage City Council

Federal

In the United States House of Representatives, Rancho Mirage High School is Split between two congressional district in California's 41st congressional district which covers the south side of Campus is represented by Republican Ken Calvert and in California's 25th congressional district which covers the north side of Campus is represented by Democrat Raul Ruiz.

== Notable alumni ==
- Daniel Whelan – professional football punter
