= Xavier College Preparatory High School (California) =

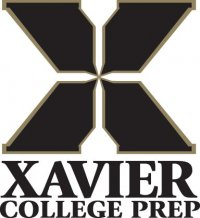
- Forming Men and Women With and For Others

Location
- 34-200 Cook Street; Palm Desert, Riverside County, California 92211; United States
- 33°47′43″N 116°21′05″W

Information
- School type: Private, Catholic Co-educational College-preparatory high school
- Motto: Latin: Ad Majorem Dei Gloriam; English: For the Greater Glory of God
- Religious affiliation: Roman Catholic
- Patron saints: Saint Francis Xavier, S.J.
- Established: 2006; 20 years ago
- Oversight: Roman Catholic Diocese of San Bernardino
- President: Mark Campbell
- Dean: Christina Figueroa
- Principal: Jeffery Howard
- Grades: 9–12
- Gender: Co-educational
- Enrollment: 576 (2022–2023)
- Average class size: 19
- Student to teacher ratio: 10:1
- Campus size: 69 acres (280,000 m^{2})
- Colors: Black and gold
- Athletics conference: Desert Empire League (previously Desert Valley League)
Varsity Sports
Sports	31 varsity sports 16 Boys varsity teams: Baseball; Basketball; Volleyball; Beach Volleyball; Football; Badminton; Cross Country; Golf; Soccer; Swimming; Tennis; Track; Water Polo; E Sports; Dance; Cheer; 15 Girls varsity teams: Basketball; Softball; Volleyball; Beach Volleyball; Badminton; Cross Country; Golf; Soccer; Swimming; Tennis; Track; Water Polo; E Sports; Dance; Cheer
- Mascot: Saint
- Team name: Saints
- Accreditation: Western Association of Schools and Colleges
- Tuition: $15,000 (2022–2023)
- Affiliation: Society of Jesus
- Alumni: 1531
- Website: www.xavierprep.org

Xavier College Preparatory High School is a private Jesuit high school in the Coachella Valley. It is located in the unincorporated Thousand Palms area, just outside the northern city limits of Palm Desert. The school falls within the Diocese of San Bernardino.

== Academics ==
Xavier College Prep was established in 2006 with 48 freshman students. In 2009–2010 the first senior class had 60 graduates, all of whom went on to college. As of 2022, Xavier College Prep has over 576 students in 9th, 10th, 11th, and 12th grade, and a student to teacher ratio of 10:1. Tuition is $15,000, with 50% of students receiving need-based aid. The student profile for the school is 51% female, 49% male, and 48% minority. Xavier admits students on the basis of their ability to succeed in a college preparatory environment. The school does not rank its students. For admission, students must submit an application, references, transcripts, and sit for the High School Placement Test (HSPT). Incoming students must also have an interview with the admissions committee.

== Sports ==
The sports teams are known as the Saints and compete in the Desert Empire League. Average enrollment in DEL high schools exceeds 2,000 with some exceeding 3,000. This makes Xavier the smallest, with about 600 students. Xavier manages to continually field competitive teams in every sport.

The Saints' Cross Country boys' team won the 2014 State Championship and the girls finished tenth in their respective Division 5 races at the 2010 CIF Cross Country State Finals in Fresno, California.

In 2011, the Xavier College Prep girls' cross country team were the first sport team from the school to earn a Desert Valley League title.
