= Coachella Valley High School =

Public high school in California, United States

Coordinates: 33.6447°N 116.2008°W

Location
- 83-800 Airport Boulevard; Thermal, California 92236; United States

Information
- Type: Public
- Established: 1910
- School district: Coachella Valley Unified School District
- Principal: Arthur Sanchez
- Teaching staff: 121.59 (FTE)
- Enrollment: 2,345 (2023–2024)
- Student to teacher ratio: 19.29
- Colors: Green and gold
- Nickname: Mighty Arabs
- Website: cvhs.cvusd.us

Coachella Valley High School is a public high school for grades 9–12. It is located in Thermal, California. The District includes elementary and middle school sites to accommodate a fast-growing population of the area. The population is 90% Hispanic and consists mainly of residents from Coachella. Many students also come from areas such as Indio and Thermal.

== History ==
The high school was opened in September 1910 after 10 acres (40,000 m^{2}) of desert brush land was donated. Coachella Valley High School is the oldest public school in the Coachella Valley. It was incorporated into the Coachella Valley Unified School District in 1973 to include a high school instead of only elementary schools in nearby Coachella. A second high school, Desert Mirage High School opened in 2003 to ease overcrowding which peaked at 2,500 in the early 2000s.

The school's location was decided on because it was the central point of the Coachella Valley. In 2002, social studies teacher Chauncey Veatch was honored as National Teacher of the Year.

=== Arab mascot controversy ===
The school mascot, "Arabs,” was named in the 1930s to honor the once large Arab colony involved in the date palm growing industry. The school took the position that the name was a "gift" to the Arab peoples for their contribution to the economy of the Coachella Valley, not as a foreign racial symbol.

In 2002, Coachella Valley High School officials had a meeting to determine whether to rename the mascot out of concern it might produce negative stereotypes against Arabs and Middle Eastern people, after the September 11 terrorist attacks. They decided to keep the mascot name.

In November 2013, the American Arab Anti-Discrimination Committee described the mascot as an offensive stereotype, and began an online petition to get the school to change it. The city and school lacks Arab-Americans. The student body of Coachella Valley Unified School District's region is 99 percent Latino.

In April 2014, the committee was working to keep the Arab mascot, and to develop an image that represented the fierce warrior history of the mascot in a way that would not be considered an offensive stereotypical caricature. In addition, the students and staff were working to add in an Arab History component.

In August 2014, it was reported that the school had decided to drop the original "Arabs" mascot.

On September 9, 2014, the school board voted unanimously to adopt new logo and mascot, the "Mighty Arab." The decision was made with the approval of the American-Arab Anti-Discrimination Committee.

== Athletics ==
Sports teams compete in the Desert Valley League, in which the school is the largest school in the league. Coachella Valley High School's main athletic competition (rival) is Indio High School.

- Cheerleading (Varsity, Jr. Varsity, & Freshman)
- Football (Varsity, Jr. Varsity, & Freshman)
- Volleyball (Varsity, Jr. Varsity, & Freshman)
- Boys Cross Country (Varsity/Jr. Varsity)
- Girls Cross Country (Varsity/Jr. Varsity)
- Boys Soccer (Varsity/Jr. Varsity)
- Girls Soccer (Varsity/ Jr. Varsity)
- Wrestling (Varsity/ Jr. Varsity)
- Swimming
- Tennis (Varsity, Jr. Varsity, & Freshman)
- Baseball (Varsity, Jr. Varsity, & Freshman)
- dance

== Notable alumni ==
- Jim Criner – football coach
- Eduardo Garcia - former Coachella mayor, Assemblyman
- Benjamin Montoya - U.S. Navy rear admiral
- Alan O'Day – singer songwriter
- Joe Ortiz - Radio-Television Talk Show host, published author
- Raul Ruiz - congressman
