= Palm Desert High School =

Public high school in California, United States

Coordinates: 33°43′58″N 116°21′30″W

- 74910 Aztec Road, Palm Desert, California 92260

Information
- Type: Public
- Established: 1986
- Principal: Sarit Saig
- Teaching staff: 78.43 (FTE)
- Enrollment: 2,039 (2023–2024)
- Student to teacher ratio: 26.00
- Color
- Mascot: Aztec
- Rival: La Quinta High School
- Newspaper: The Spear
- Yearbook: Desert Reflections
- Website: pdhs.dsusd.us

Palm Desert High School is a secondary school located in Palm Desert, California. The school is a part of the Desert Sands Unified School District.

== Academics ==
Palm Desert offers numerous Advanced Placement and Honors courses, amongst CP classes.

== Sports ==
Palm Desert's mascot is the Aztec. The school has football, tennis, cross country, soccer, track, golf, swimming, baseball, softball, volleyball, basketball, wrestling, water polo, and equestrian teams. Their main rival in the Desert Empire League is the La Quinta High School Blackhawks in the neighboring city of La Quinta, which plays in the annual "Flag Game" in football. Palm Desert also plays in "The Battle of Cook Street" with Xavier College Prep, located several miles to the north also off of Cook Street.

== Reconstruction ==
Palm Desert High School was reconstructed as part of the District's $100 million bond used for PDHS, Lincoln, Kennedy, and Eisenhower schools. The new campus has been built to the north of the old campus using the former sports fields for land. The project was completely finished by the beginning of the 2011–12 school year. The new fields opened by the following year. A new gymnasium has been built to seat approximately 2000 students.

== Notable alumni ==
- Travis Adams - class of 2018, Major League Baseball pitcher for the Minnesota Twins organization
- D. J. Alexander - class of 2010, NFL linebacker with the Philadelphia Eagles
- Scott Burcham - American-Israeli baseball shortstop in the Colorado Rockies organization, and for Team Israel
- Nicole Castrale – class of 1997, professional golfer on LPGA Tour
- Chris Clapinski - class of 1989, former Major League Baseball player
- James Dockery – class of 2006, NFL cornerback with the Carolina Panthers
- Thomas DeMarco - class of 2007, CFL quarterback with the Ottawa Redblacks
- Josh Homme – class of 1991, Queens of the Stone Age, Eagles of Death Metal, Kyuss, and Them Crooked Vultures
- Jesse Hughes – class of 1990, singer and guitarist of rock band Eagles of Death Metal
- Brooks Kriske - class of 2012, Major League Baseball pitcher for the New York Yankees and Baltimore Orioles
- Desirae Krawczyk - class of 2012, professional tennis player, mixed doubles winner of the French Open, US Open, and Wimbledon
- Alison Lohman – class of 1997, actress
- Brian Serven - class of 2013, Major League Baseball catcher for the Colorado Rockies
- Jeremiah Estrada - class of 2017, Major League Baseball pitcher for the San Diego Padres
