= Coachella Valley Unified School District =

Public school district in Riverside County, California

Address
- 87225 Church Street Coachella Valley Thermal, Riverside County, Imperial County, California, 92274; United States

District information
- Type: Public
- Grades: K–12
- School board: Coachella Valley Unified School District Board of Education
- Schools: 21

Other information
- Website: www.cvusd.us

The Coachella Valley Unified School District is a public school district in Riverside County, California and Imperial County, California, United States, with headquarters in Thermal. The District serves a 1,250-square-mile (3,200 km^{2}) area, including the cities of Coachella, Indio (southern portion) and La Quinta (eastern portion) and the following unincorporated communities:

- Desert Shores (Imperial County)
- Mecca
- North Shore
- Oasis
- Salton City (Imperial County)
- Salton Sea Beach (Imperial County)
- Thermal
- Vista Santa Rosa

The CVUSD headquarters is located at 87225 Church St., Thermal, CA 92274. The district accommodates a fast-growing population of the area, which is predominantly Hispanic (over 80% of CVUSD students, excluding those from seasonal migrant laborers) and residents from Coachella are a large portion of students in the high school.

== Schools ==
The CVUSD has 14 elementary schools, 3 middle schools and 3 high schools, plus one continuation high school and one special school for teenage mothers. The oldest schools in CVUSD include: Coachella Valley High (joined the CVUSD in the 1960s when created out of Coachella Public Schools). Palm View opened in 1939, Bobby Duke and Peter Pendelton schools opened in the 1940s, and Valley View school opened in the 1950s. Mecca and Oasis schools were county schools, so was Kokell school in Thermal; they joined the CVUSD in the 1970s.

=== Elementary (grades K to 6) ===
- Cesar Chavez Elementary, Coachella, CA - opened in 1991/92.
- Coral Mountain Elementary, Coachella, CA - opened in 2006/07.
- John Kelley School, Thermal, CA (replaced Kokell school) in 1991-92.
- Las Palmitas Elementary, Thermal, CA - opened 2003/2004.
- Mecca Elementary School, Mecca, CA -new facility.
- Mountain Vista Elementary, Indio, CA - opened in 2003/04.
- Oasis Elementary School, Oasis, CA (Grades K-8) - new facility/new site.
- North Shore Elementary, Mecca, CA - opened in 2025/2026.
- Palm View Elementary, Coachella, CA - opened 1939, partially renovated.
- Peter Pendleton Elementary, Coachella, CA (was middle school, switched in 1991/92).
- Saul Martinez Elementary, Mecca, CA - opened in 1998/99.
- Sea View Elementary (Grades K-6), Salton City, CA - new location opened in 2007.
- Valle Del Sol Elementary, Coachella, CA - opened in 2006/07.
- Valley View Elementary, Coachella, CA - opened in 1950/51 - oldest CVUSD grade school.
- Westside Elementary School, Thermal, CA. - originally began 1963 (CV High then Pendleton), current site 1989/90. (was K-8 school). Mecca, Oasis and Westside were county schools until the 1960s.

=== Middle Schools (grades 7 & 8) ===
- Bobby Duke Middle School (formerly Dateland Middle and was middle school 1961 to 94, briefly an elementary school, 1994 to 2010).
- Cahuilla Desert Academy (CDA), Coachella, CA, opened in 1996/97.
- Toro Canyon Middle School, Thermal, CA, opened in 2004/05.

=== High schools ===
- Coachella Valley High School in Thermal, oldest CVUSD school in existence since 1910. The campus included former schools Union (moved to Thermal) and Ensign (moved to Vista Santa Rosa), both closed. (annexed by Coachella in 1980).
- Desert Mirage High School (grades 9–12) opened in 2004/05 in Thermal, California.
- La Familia continuation High School (formerly Kokell School closed in 1991).
- West Shores High School (for grades 7-12) is located in Salton City, California. Sea View Elementary used to share the same location as West Shores High School until September 2007. The current principal is Olivia Mejorado.

=== Other (Housed at CVUSD sites) ===
- Adult School/Escuela del Adulto (On Palm View site).
- Coachella Valley Virtual Academy
- Independent Studies K-12
