= La Quinta High School (La Quinta, California) =

Location
- 79255 Blackhawk Way; La Quinta, California 92253; United States; 33.713528°N 116.280912°W

Information
- Type: Public
- Opened: 1994
- School district: Desert Sands Unified School District
- Principal: Gregg O'Mara
- Grades: 9-12
- Enrollment: 2,488 (2023-2024)
- Colors: Burgundy and Navy
- Mascot: Blackhawk
- Newspaper: Hawkview
- Website: lqhs.dsusd.us

La Quinta High School is one of six public high schools, grades 9–12, in the Desert Sands Unified School District. It is located in La Quinta, California. The school was a California Distinguished Schools award winner in 1999, 2003 and 2011.

== History ==
La Quinta High School was built in 1994 but fully completed by 1996. In its first year it had an enrollment of approximately 600 students and held only grades 9-10. It now serves grades 9–12 and is the largest high school in the Coachella Valley.

It is the home of the La Quinta Blackhawk Brigade marching band and color guard.

In 2010, La Quinta High School's Air Force Junior Reserve Officer Training Corps received the Distinguished Unit award, making the unit part of the top 5% of junior ROTC units worldwide.

In 2016, the Clinton Foundation brought their Clinton Day of Action to La Quinta High School, and provided them with a new greenhouse, campus cleanup, and a new desert landscape in the front of the school.

On January 30, 2026, La Quinta High School students participated in a walk out as part of the “ICE Out” protests.

== Academics ==
In 2006, the school was ranked 614th in Newsweek's "The Complete List: 1,200 Top U.S. Schools". In the most recent available API index (2013) the school had the highest growth API score in the Coachella Valley with an 842.

== Career Technical Education programs and academies ==
La Quinta High School has four academies for students that have a feel of what they want to do once they get older. These academies educates them about the field they would want to get into and prepares them to be able to continue their education after graduation.

=== Medical Health Academy ===
The Medical Health Academy is a California Partnership Academy grant-funded program for students interested in pursuing a career and college in the medical field. This is a Career Technical Program.

This program can be taken by any student interested starting their second year.

=== Public Service Academy ===
The Public Service Academy program has grown from 100 students 10 years ago to over 260 students today. After students complete the three-year program, they are able to move into productive jobs in law enforcement, fire fighting, military and related fields.

=== Culinary Arts ===
The Culinary Arts program is for students that want to pursue a career in the kitchen. It is a 4-year program where they get to meet chefs from around the Coachella Valley, create Culinary Showdowns much like in the television show Chopped, and cater meals to events valley wide as well as provide some of the food for La Quinta High Schools' events.

In 2016, The Clinton Foundation brought their Clinton Day of Action to La Quinta High School and built a greenhouse for the culinary arts students to use in their state of the art kitchen.

=== Information & Communications Technology Academy ===
The Information & Communications Technology Academy is the newest academy in La Quinta High School. It was added in the 2015–2016 school year. The academy is for students who are interested in technology. It is a dynamic program set up to give interested students the opportunity to be exposed to fields related to Information Support and Services, Networking, Software and Systems Development, Cybersecurity, and Games and Simulation. The program is a 4-year course and offers students technical training as well as educational core classes, and an optional public speaking course for fourth year students.

== Athletics ==
La Quinta High's mascot is the "Blackhawk", they participate in the Desert Empire League (formerly the Desert Valley League) and the school enjoys a rivalry with Palm Desert High School. La Quinta is the only school in the Coachella Valley with a rugby union program. It was the first school in the Coachella Valley to win two consecutive CIF football championships. The school has also won three consecutive CIF wrestling championships in 2009, 2010, and 2011. The school's water polo team has also to win the CIF water polo championships in 2012 to become the first team to win CIF in the Coachella Valley. The boys soccer team also won CIF Division 2 in 2015.

== Notable alumni ==
- Tyler Hilton – American actor and singer-songwriter
- Jeff Webb – American football player for the Kansas City Chiefs of the National Football League
- Anthony Kim – American pro golfer
- Johnathan Ingram – professional football player with the NFL
- Sabrina Cervantes – state representative for California's 60th Assembly District
- Marco Pitruzzella – professional musician
- Abi Carter - American singer & Season 22 American Idol winner (She attended for less than a semester and returned to being homeschooled.)
