= KMRJ =

Coordinates: 33.871°N 116.228°W

- Rancho Mirage, California; United States
- Broadcast area: Palm Springs, California
- Frequency: 99.5 MHz
- Branding: Jammin' 99.5

Programming
- Format: Rhythmic AC

Ownership
- Owner: Marker Broadcasting
- Sister stations: KJJZ, KPLM, KRHQ

History
- First air date: July 17, 1998

Technical information
- Licensing authority: FCC
- Facility ID: 15475
- Class: A
- ERP: 3,000 watts
- HAAT: 100 meters (328 ft)

Links
- Public license information: Public file; LMS
- Webcast: Listen Live
- Website: jammin995fm.com

KMRJ (99.5 MHz, "Jammin' 99.5") is a commercial FM radio station licensed to Rancho Mirage, California, and serving the Palm Springs radio market. The signal covers the Coachella Valley and parts of the Morongo Basin and Palo Verde Valley. It is owned by Marker Broadcasting. KMRJ uses the slogan "The Coachella Valley's Old School."

KMRJ broadcasts at an effective radiated power of 3,000 watts. Its studios and offices are on Merle Drive in Palm Desert, California. The transmitter is in Indio Hills, California.

== Programming ==
It carries the legendary Art Laboe "Love Zone" program, based in his studio in Palm Springs. heard across California, the Western United States and on the internet.

== History ==
On July 17, 1998, KMRJ signed on the air. The station aired an alternative rock format as "M99.5." KMRJ flipped to classic rock as "99.5 The Heat" in July 2008. In October 2009, ownership changed from Mitchell Media to RM Broadcasting, owners of KPLM, KJJZ (now KRHQ) and KAJR (now KJJZ). The studios were relocated as well.

On September 13, 2010, KMRJ began carrying the syndicated Kevin and Bean morning show broadcast from Los Angeles alternative station KROQ-FM. It also carried the syndicated radio show Nights with Alice Cooper.

On August 31, 2012, after playing Wild Cherry's "Play That Funky Music" over and over for several hours, KMRJ flipped formats to Rhythmic AC as "Jammin' 99.5," with an emphasis on Rhythmic hits and Old School classics.
