= KJJZ =

Coordinates: 33.801°N 116.225°W

- Indian Wells, California; United States
- Broadcast area: Palm Springs, California
- Frequency: 95.9 MHz (HD Radio)
- Branding: Kool 95.9

Programming
- Format: Oldies
- Subchannels: HD2: Alt 101.5 (Alternative rock); HD3: 102.7 The Fanatic (Sports); HD4: La Grande 100.9 (Regional Mexican)

Ownership
- Owner: Marker Broadcasting
- Sister stations: KPLM, KMRJ, KRHQ

History
- First air date: January 10, 2007 (as KAJR)
- Former call signs: KAJR (2007–2015)
- Call sign meaning: Refers to former Smooth Jazz station at 102.3

Technical information
- Licensing authority: FCC
- Facility ID: 165313
- Class: A
- ERP: 1,750 watts
- HAAT: 189 meters (620 ft)
- Translators: HD2: 101.5 K268AH (Palm Springs); HD3: 102.7 K274DA (Thousand Palms); HD4: 100.9 K265FH (Cathedral City)

Links
- Public license information: Public file; LMS
- Webcast: Listen live; HD2: Listen live; HD3: Listen live; HD4: Listen live
- Website: kool959fm.com; HD2: alt1015fm.com; HD3: 1027thefanatic.com; HD4: la1009.com

KJJZ (95.9 FM, "Kool 95.9") is a radio station licensed to Indian Wells, California and broadcasting to the greater Coachella Valley and the Morongo Basin, including Palm Springs. Owned by Marker Broadcasting, it broadcasts an oldies radio format. The studios are on Merle Drive in Palm Desert.

== History ==
The station first signed on as KAJR and aired an adult hits format as "95.9 Jack FM". The station was launched to give the Coachella Valley a Jack-FM branded station as (KCBS-FM) in Los Angeles, was about 100 miles (160 km) to the west, and could not be listened to in the Coachella Valley.

Three years later in 2010, the station rebranded as "95.9 The Oasis" and adapted a soft adult contemporary format. On August 15, 2016, KJJZ rebranded as "Kool 95.9". In March 2021, the station flipped to hot adult contemporary, maintaining the "Kool 95.9" branding and adding the syndicated Elvis Duran and the Morning Show and On Air with Ryan Seacrest.

On September 20, 2021, KJJZ tweaked their format from hot adult contemporary to Top 40/CHR, branded as "Hot 95.9".

On August 22, 2022, KJJZ changed their format from Top 40/CHR to 1960s-1970s oldies, branded as "Kool 95.9".

== KJJZ-HD2 ==
On January 28, 2018, KJJZ launched an alternative rock format on its HD2 subchannel, branded as "Alt 101.5". This was the first time the Palm Springs area had an alternative rock station since KMRJ abandoned the format in 2008. The subchannel feeds FM translator K268AH at 101.5 FM in Palm Springs.

== KJJZ-HD3 ==
KJJZ offers a sports radio format on its HD3 subchannel. Programming is mostly from CBS Sports Radio. It also carries the syndicated Dan Patrick Show from Fox Sports Radio. The subchannel feeds FM translator K274DA at 102.7 FM in Thousand Palms. This programming was previously heard on KXPS 1010 AM. On June 1, 2022, KXPS went silent.

== KJJZ-HD4 ==
On August 26, 2022, KJJZ began broadcasting a dance music format on its HD4 subchannel, branded as "NRG" pronounced like the word "energy" The HD4 channel is paired with FM translator K265FH at 100.9 FM in Cathedral City. That translator station had been used to rebroadcast KPSF (1200 AM). The HD4 subchannel and 100.9 translator are programmed independently from KJJZ. They are operated by NRG Broadcasting, LLC. On June 1, 2022, KPSF went silent.

On September 28, 2023, the "NRG" dance format ceased broadcasting on KJJZ-HD4 and K265FH, but continues its online stream through its website.

On November 6, 2023, KJJZ-HD4 launched a Regional Mexican format, branded as "La Grande 100.9".
