= Date shake =

Type of sweet drink using dates as the main ingredient

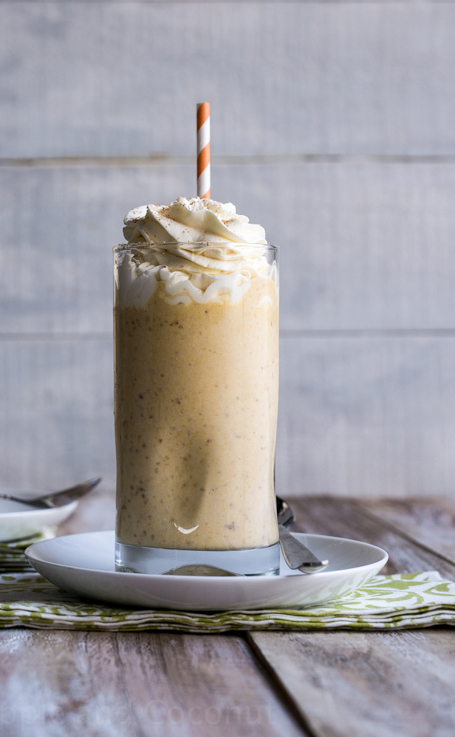
- Course: Beverage
- Place of origin: United States
- Region or state: Coachella Valley
- Created by: Russ Nicholl
- Serving temperature: Cold
- Main ingredients: Dates, ice cream
- Variations: Fresh, sugar crystal

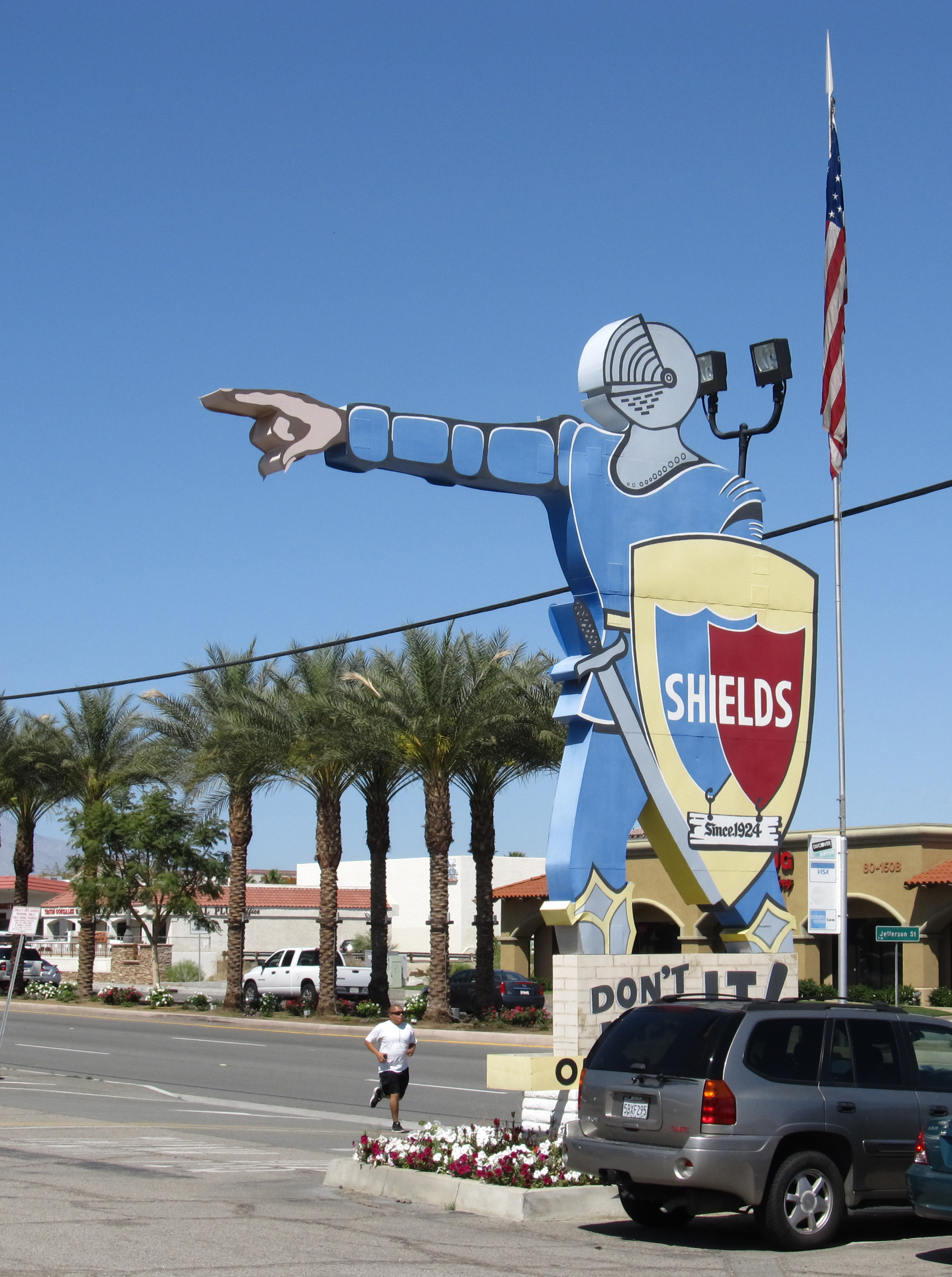
40'-tall "knight" highway sign for Shields Date Garden, Indio, California

A date shake is a milkshake made with dates. The drink originated in, and is particularly associated with, the Coachella Valley in California.

== Preparation ==
A date shake is typically made with a base of milk or ice cream and blended; a shake can contain about 1/2 cup (~120 mL) of dates.

Another method, invented in 1936 by Shield's Date Garden, involves the use of date crystals, small, dried date particles that are sweetened with date sugar. The crystals are then mixed with water to create a paste before being blended with other ingredients. An alternative method involves baking the dates, which are then blended to a paste-like consistency.

Date shakes are high in fiber, iron, potassium, and niacin. They have a high sugar and calorific content.

== History ==
At the end of the 19th century into the beginning of the 20th, plant explorers from the USDA were sent to search globally for new crops that could be farmed in North America. These explorers returned with date palms from North Africa and the Middle East. The explorer, Walter Swingle brought back six medjool date offshoots from a Moroccan oasis; these six offshoot specimens "account for all the megool dates grown in the US."

In 1928, Russell Nicoll (sometimes spelled Nichol) and his family built a roadside shack near Thermal, California. Another news source states that Nicoll built his shack in 1919. A few years later, this shack was expanded and named Valerie Jean after Nicoll's daughter. With electricity and refrigeration, the Nicolls were able to offer variations of ingredients blended with their supply of dates. Nicoll was reportedly inspired by stories of nomads in the Middle East who he heard "lived entirely on dates and goat’s milk".

In 1924 Floyd and Bess Shields opened the Shields Date Garden in Indio to compete with the quickly growing date industry in Coachella Valley.

The Coachella Valley has numerous date shake shops, many of them are located on Highway 111. The small desert town of Westmoreland, where medjool dates are grown, and Indio, where Shields is located, are known for their date shakes. The drink has been called the "unofficial drink of the Coachella Valley" or the "unofficial drink of Palm Springs."

They are a popular drink at the Riverside County Fair and National Date Festival and during the Coachella Valley Music and Arts Festival.

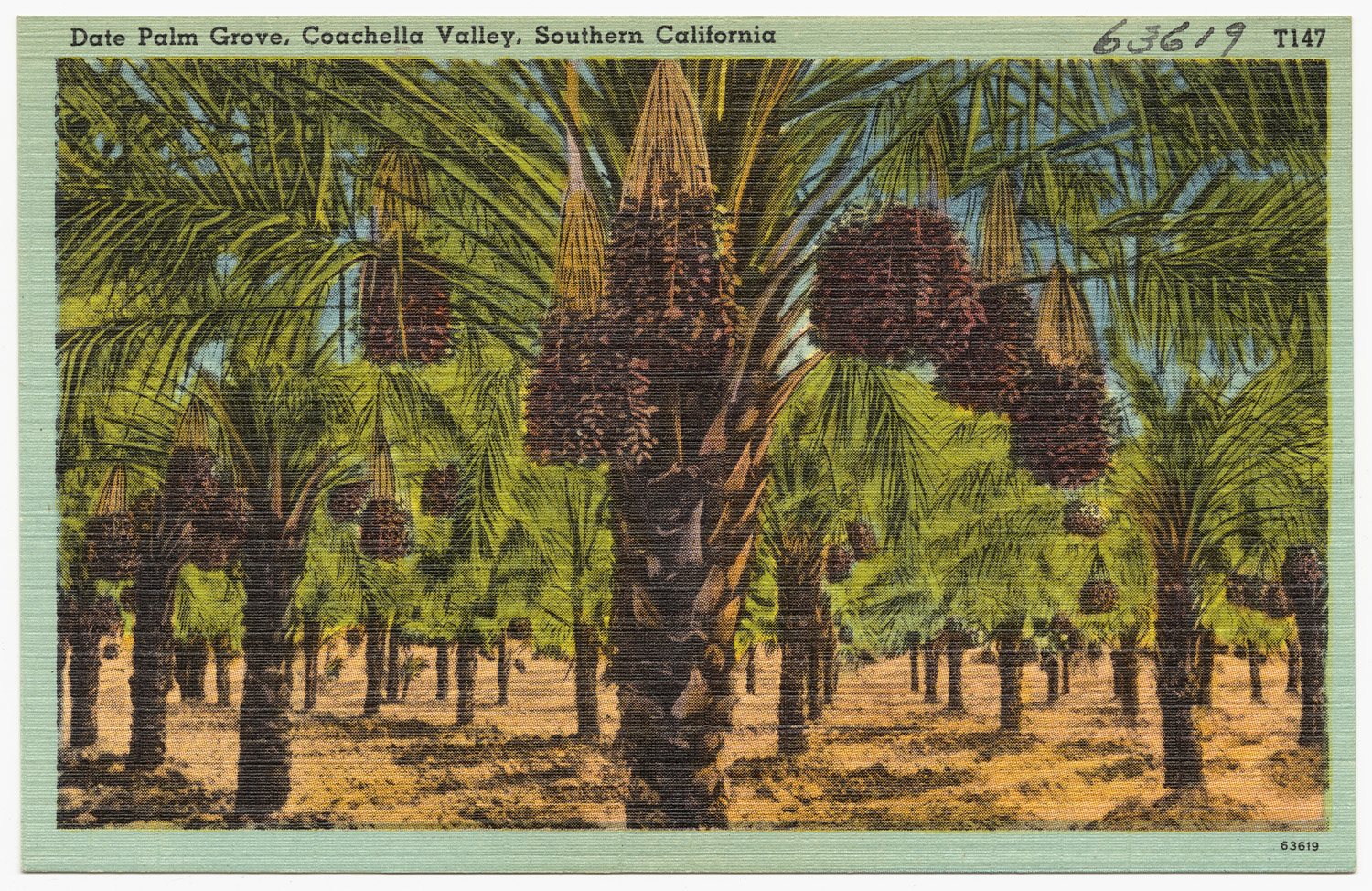
Date Palm Grove, Coachella Valley, Southern California
