= KXPS =

Sports radio station in Palm Desert, California

Coordinates: 33°50′35.1″N 116°25′42″W

- Thousand Palms, California; United States
- Broadcast area: Palm Springs, California
- Frequency: 1010 kHz

Programming
- Format: Oldies

Ownership
- Owner: Ronald Cohen; (CRC Media West, LLC)
- Sister stations: KPSF

History
- First air date: November 14, 1992; 33 years ago (as KPSL)
- Former call signs: KPSL (1992–1998); KNWZ (1998–2001); KCMJ (1/2001-8/2001); KXPS (2001–2004); KNWT (3/12/2004-3/31/2004)
- Call sign meaning: K X Palm Springs (area)

Technical information
- Licensing authority: FCC
- Facility ID: 22342
- Class: B
- Power: 3,600 watts day 400 watts night

Links
- Public license information: Public file; LMS

KXPS (1010 AM) was a radio station licensed to Thousand Palms, California, United States. It previously broadcast a sports radio format.

== History ==
Former logo

The station signed on November 14, 1992. The original call sign was KPSL, simulcasting with KPSI. It went through different changes under radio stations KCLB/KCHV, KDES, "K-News" (KCMJ) and KREO/KUNA in the 1970s, '80s and '90s would use that AM dial for temporary periods of time.

Its previous sports format had a lineup from a variety of sources: The Dan Patrick Show from Fox Sports Radio and The Jim Rome Show from CBS Sports Radio, with the remainder of their non-local programming coming from CBS Sports Radio. The station offers local programming during the weekdays with Pure Sports with Geoff "The Dome" Bloom, which airs from 3:00 PM to 6:00 PM PST, featuring co-host Barry Long. Team 1010 also carries local weekend programming; such as "Golf is a 4 Letter Word", on Saturdays from 10:00 AM to 11:00 AM PST, hosted by Françoise Rhodes.

The station moved ownership from the Desert Radio Group to CRC Media West in 2011 and in the move gained rights to numerous play by play properties in the Coachella Valley. The Coachella Valley's sports station began airing USC Trojans Football in 2012, as well as Oakland Raiders Football, Los Angeles Clippers Basketball, and Los Angeles Angels of Anaheim Baseball (all of which were sports properties on stations owned by R&R Broadcasting). Team 1010 carries Monday Night, Thursday Night, and Sunday Night NFL games each season, as well as regular season College Basketball and The NCAA Men's Basketball Tournament, which began airing on the station in 2013.

On May 26, 2022, KXPS began promoting a "change is coming" on June 1, 2022. On that day, the station went silent and its sports format moved to KJJZ-HD3 as "102.7 The Fanatic". On April 22, 2024 the station resumed operations. The Federal Communications Commission cancelled the station’s license on December 15, 2025.
