= Magnificent Montague =

American R&B disc jockey (born 1928)

Nathaniel "Magnificent" Montague (born in New Jersey, January 11, 1928), is an American R&B disc jockey notable not only for the soul music records he helped promote on KGFJ Los Angeles and WWRL New York City, but also his trademark catch-phrase, "Burn, baby! Burn!" that became the rallying cry of the 1965 Watts riots. Following criticism that this phrase had inadvertently stirred up rioters, Montague advocated non-violence and urged young listeners to pursue their education, coining the new phrase "Learn, baby! Learn!"

Semi-retired by the mid-1970s, Montague relocated to Palm Springs, California, where he was instrumental in the launch of easy listening KPLM, today a successful country music station. His was the first radio station construction permit issued to an African-American in four decades.

Montague's catchphrase was referenced in the Apollo 11 software code that took Neil Armstrong and Buzz Aldrin to the Moon in 1969: "BURN, BABY, BURN – MASTER IGNITION ROUTINE". In 2009, on the 40th anniversary of the first moonwalk, Don Eyles attributed this code reference to Montague.

The catchphrase would also be referenced in the 1976 hit "Disco Inferno" by the Trammps.

His autobiography, Burn, Baby! Burn! (ISBN 978-0252028731) was published in October 2003 by the University of Illinois Press.

== African-American memory collector ==
For 50 years, Montague and his wife Rose Thaddeus Casalan (known as Rose Catalon as songwriter) acquired a collection of African-American visual culture, historical artifacts and documents, known as the Montague Collection, on display at the Meek-Eaton Black Archives Research Center and Museum of the Florida Agricultural and Mechanical University, in Tallahassee, since February 14, 2017.

== Personal life ==
Montague retired with his wife Rose to Las Vegas, Nevada. He is a convert to Judaism.
