= Riverside County Fair and National Date Festival =

Fair held in Indio, California

Coordinates: 33°42′45″N 116°13′22″W

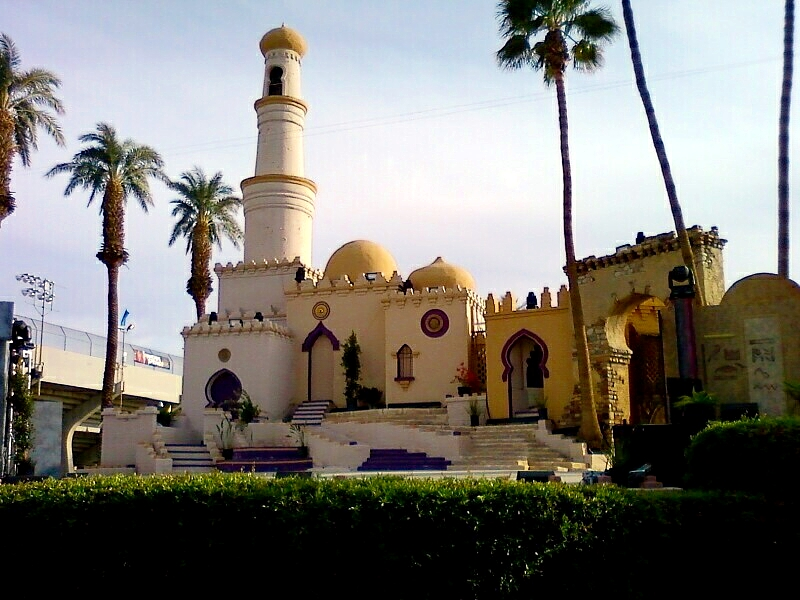
- The Celebration Stage hosts many of the fair's performances
- Genre: County fair, Fair, Food Festival
- Date: 13 days (mid February to early March)
- Frequency: Annually
- Location: Indio, California
- Years active: 79 (at Riverside County Fairgrounds)
- Inaugurated: 1921 (at Indio City Park)
- Organiser: Riverside County Economic Development Agency Pickering Events LLC
- Website: www.datefest.org

The Riverside County Fair and National Date Festival takes place in Indio, California. Since 1947 the annual festival has been held to celebrate the Date Palm harvest in the Coachella Valley. The event is held in February on the Riverside County Fairgrounds. The fair is located in Indio, California, a city in the Colorado Desert, approximately 130 miles (210 km) east of Los Angeles.

The Coachella Valley has about 250,000 date palms planted on approximately 5,000 acres (20 km^{2}) which produces 35,000,000 pounds of dates annually. This long-standing agricultural industry is responsible for 95 percent of the nation's crop of dates.

The Date Festival has more than 7000 exhibits and competitions related to the fruit. It has grown to feature musicians and comedians, a Date Festival Queen and her court, monster trucks and bull-riding.

Safety for the fair is provided by the Indio Police Department, the Riverside County Sheriff's Office, and private security.

== History ==
The Fair started as a festival to celebrate the end of the annual date harvest in Southern California's desert region, the major commercial date-producing area in the Western Hemisphere. Dates were an unknown commodity in the desert until 1903 when date palms were transplanted there from Algeria. By the early 1920s dates became a major crop for the area. Date groves in the Coachella Valley also became tourist attractions.

With the popularity of the date gardens the idea was planted for the first Date Festival in 1921 to be held in Indio's city park. A second festival was held the following year. Some 16 years later a third Date Festival was held, this time under the name of the Riverside County Fair and the Coachella Valley Date Festival. The Indio Civic Club, under contract from the County Board of Supervisors, sponsored the event.

That year there were 72 booths exhibited and attendance reached 5,000. It was also the first year the street parade was staged. In 1936 Western themes were in style and the Fair took on a Western theme complete with wiskerenos, cowboy hats, and rodeo events.

In 1940 the County purchased the present fairgrounds. The original 40 acres (160,000 m^{2}) cost $10,000 and over the years later the grounds were expanded with the purchase of an additional 40 acres (160,000 m^{2}) including the date grove on the fairgrounds. Presently, the fairgrounds cover 120 acres (0.49 km^{2}).

When World War II started all fairs in California were halted. When the War ended, Robert M.C. Fullenwider was hired to manage the Riverside County Fair and National Date Festival. Fullenwider introduced an "Arabian Nights" theme tying in with the desert region and date industry.

Besides 1923 to 1937 and 1942 to 1945, no fair has happened in 2021-22 due to the COVID-19 pandemic. However, 2022 had "Thrillville", a smaller carnival and event.

The Riverside County Board of Supervisors approved in June 2022 a partnership with Pickering Events LLC to bring the Date Festival back to Indio on an annual basis. The agreement brings back the Riverside County Fair & National Date Festival and ensure the continuation of the Fair Board as well as funding support to improve the Fairgrounds facilities, Supervisor Manuel Pérez announced.

Pérez also announced that the next Riverside County Fair & National Date Festival will be held February 17-26, 2023, and it will return as a full-scale event.

“This is great for the City of Indio, the Coachella Valley and Riverside County and for the future of the National Date Festival,” said Supervisor Pérez. “Riverside County and the Fair Board look forward to being partners with Pickering in bringing the Riverside County Fair & National Date Festival back for the community, as well as attracting events to increase use of the Fairgrounds for the community and families.”

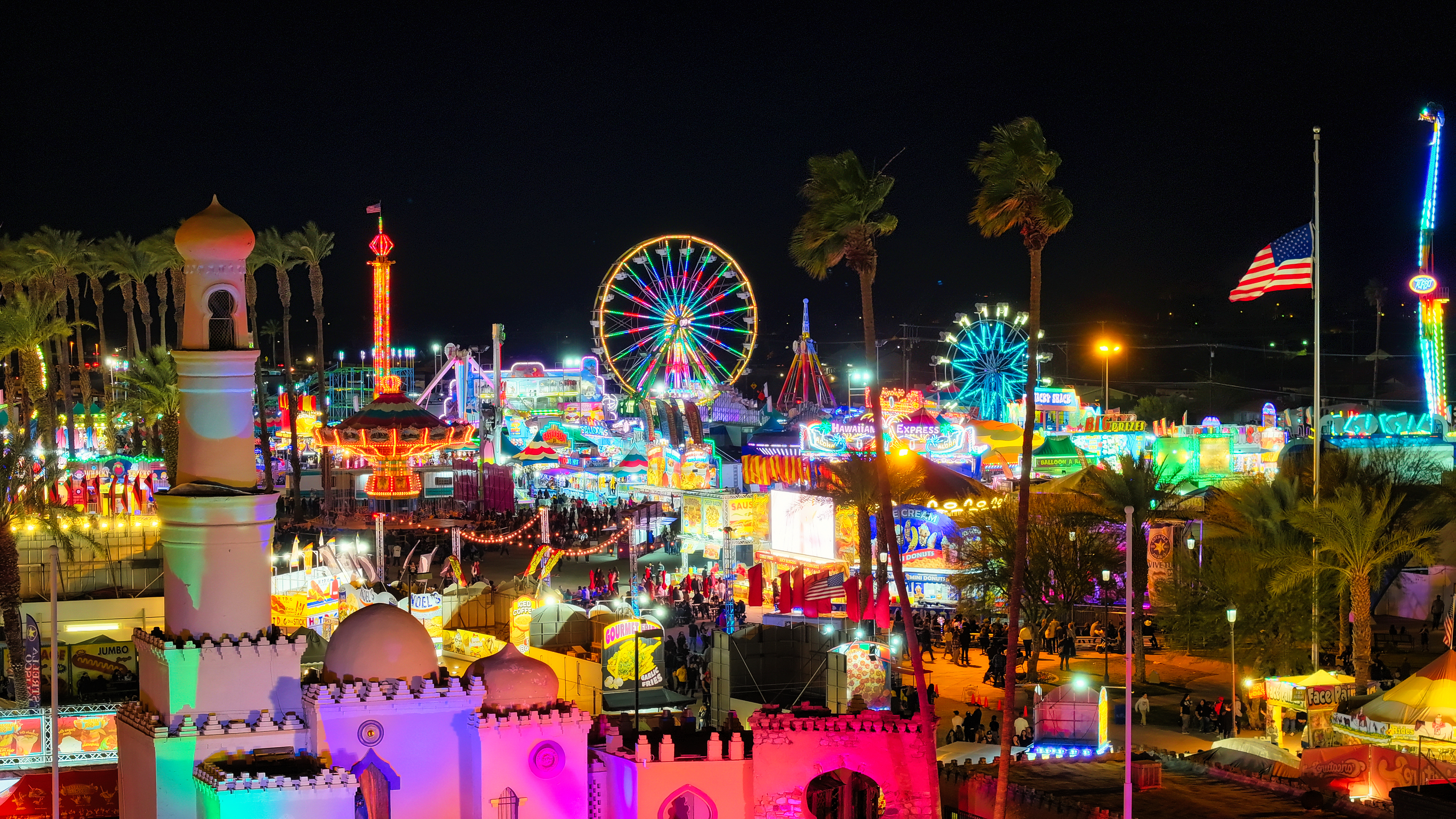
Fair & Date Fest at night

In 2025, the Fair & Date Fest was expanded to 13 days, running from the Thursday before President's Day to March 2nd. The Fair ran Thursday-Sunday each week and President's Day.

== Pageant ==
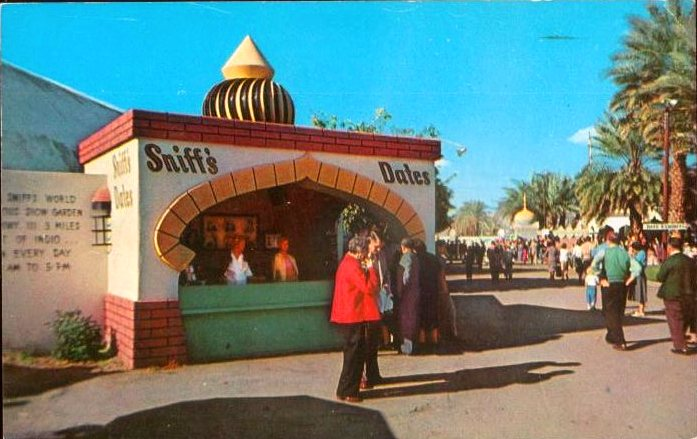
A fair vendor selling dates at the festival during the 1950s

Also, tying into this theme, the Fair had a scholarship pageant called "Queen Scheherazade". Students from Riverside County compete to win the scholarship money for continued education and act as the "good will" ambassador over the Fair.

In 2023, the Fair & Date Fest replaced the Queen Scheherazade Scholarship with the Date Festival Scholarship Program. This scholarship program is open to both male and female students in Riverside County graduating from high school who will be attending college in the next school year. At least 10 students are given a $2,000.

== See also ==
- Shields Date Gardens
