= Shields Date Gardens =

Coordinates: 33.707°N 116.267°W

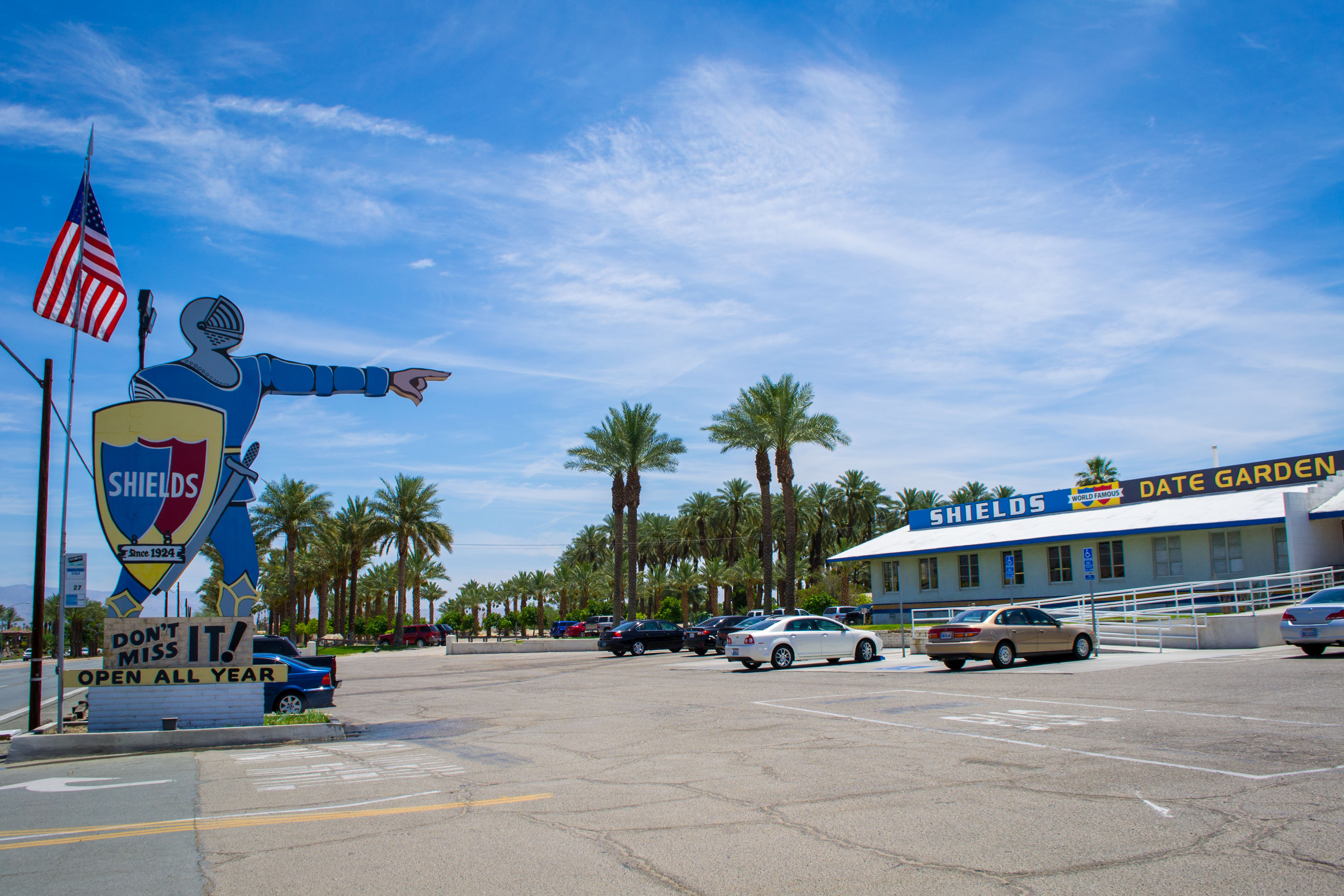
Shields Date Garden as seen from California State Route 111

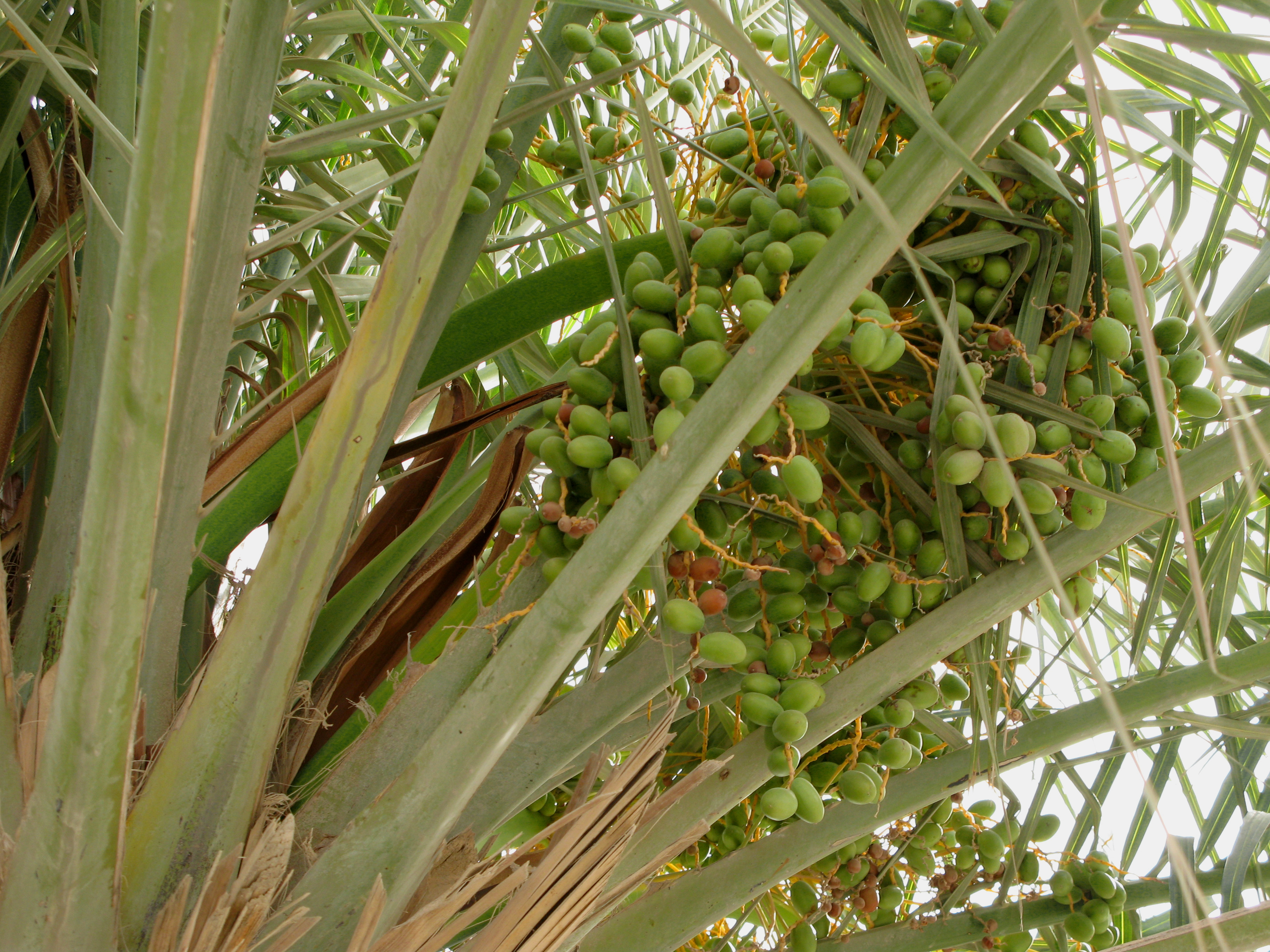
Dates, on Date palm

Shields Date Garden is a historic date palm orchard and tourist attraction in Indio, California, United States.

== History ==
The company was founded in 1924 by Floyd and Bess (Lugton) Shields. Floyd Shields was one of the pioneering date farmers in the still-young date industry of the Coachella Valley. He bred a number of his own hybrids and varieties including the "Blonde" and "Brunette" varieties, grown exclusively at Shields to this day.

=== Romance and Sex Life of the Date ===
To help promote the exotic, difficult-to-grow fruit, Shields presented lectures to his customers on the cultivation of the date. The lectures proved to be a popular draw, leading Shields to incorporate a slide show and recorded soundtrack into a multimedia presentation designed to run on a continuous basis. A 39-page booklet, titled Coachella Valley desert trails: the Salton Sea saga and the romance and sex life of the date, was first published by the Shields in 1950 and went through numerous editions.

Shields' fifteen-minute presentation, Romance and Sex Life of the Date, modified only slightly over the years, is still shown today in a small theater at Shields. A modified and improved version of the Romance and Sex Life of the Date was created in 2007 and now shown in the same theater.

== Date crystals ==
Shields was also the inventor of date sugar and the date crystal. Date sugar adds flavor to recipes and date crystals are a unique, dry blend of dates for use in cooking, on cold cereals and in date milkshakes. Date shakes and black date ice cream are popular treats sold over the counter at Shields.

== Visiting ==
The current building, with its sign depicting a knight in armor pointing toward the main entrance off Highway 111, has been in use since 1953. Skyrocketing land values in the area threatened the continued existence of Shields Date Gardens when the property was placed on the market. It was purchased by The Jewel Date Company in nearby Thermal, California, which is carrying on the traditions of the Shields at the same location with no intention of moving the Ranch Store.

== Further information ==
- In 2001, Huell Howser Productions featured Shields Date Gardens in Palm Springs Week #0002 Dates; the 29 minute program is available on VHS.

== See also ==
- Valerie Jean Dates
