= KPLM =

Radio station in Palm Springs, California, United States

Coordinates: 33.871°N 116.228°W

- Palm Springs, California; United States
- Broadcast area: Palm Springs, California
- Frequency: 106.1 MHz
- Branding: The Big 106

Programming
- Format: Country

Ownership
- Owner: Marker Broadcasting
- Sister stations: KJJZ, KMRJ, KRHQ

History
- First air date: 1974 (as KPAL)
- Former call signs: KPAL (1974–1979)
- Call sign meaning: K-PaLM, as in "Palm Springs"

Technical information
- Facility ID: 54360
- Class: B
- ERP: 50,000 watts
- HAAT: 121 meters

Links
- Webcast: Listen Live
- Website: thebig106.com

KPLM (106.1 FM) is a radio station in Palm Springs, California. The station broadcasts a country music format. The station is owned by Marker Broadcasting.

The station, then called KPAL, was founded in 1974 by Los Angeles radio personality Magnificent Montague, whose trademark shout, "Burn!" was expanded to "Burn, baby, burn" during the 1965 Watts riots. The construction permit for the station was the first issued to an African-American in four decades. Call sign "KPLM" became available in 1979 when a local television station was purchased by Esquire magazine. Today, that same TV station retains the call letters of KESQ-TV, although Esquire no longer owns it.

KPLM was an easy listening station through the first years of its existence. By the early 1980s, Montague sold his interest in the station which soon featured legendary Los Angeles radio personality Al Lohman in the weekday morning drive slot. A change was made to a contemporary country music format on January 5, 1994, giving KPLM an exclusive audience; no other FM country music station was on the air in the area at that time. After signing off the old format with "What a Wonderful World" by Louis Armstrong, the new format's first three songs were "Don't Rock the Jukebox" by Alan Jackson, "Friends in Low Places" by Garth Brooks and "Achy Breaky Heart" by Billy Ray Cyrus.

1996 saw new parent company RM Broadcasting expand its market share with the acquisition of financially troubled, Palm Desert-based KLCX, only on the air for a brief time at 102.3 MHz under a classic rock format. KLCX was immediately reformatted into KJJZ, a pioneering smooth jazz radio station. Studios for both stations are in the same Palm Springs location.

A third station, KAJR at 95.9 MHz, took to the air as a fully automated Jack FM affiliate beginning in August 2007.

KPLM has the distinction of covering a greater terrestrial area than any other Palm Springs station coupled with a worldwide audience via the internet as of November 30, 2006. KPLM's transmitter is on a mountain along the edge of Joshua Tree National Park. As a result, the station not only blankets the Coachella Valley but reaches northward to the Mojave Desert, southward to Imperial County and northern Baja California and westward via two repeaters to the San Gorgonio Pass cities of Banning, Temecula and Hemet. The first is located on Snow Peak above Banning; the second is within the city of Hemet.

The station also plays an active role in bringing major country acts to the area; indeed, the station is the most active of all Palm Springs stations in sponsoring major concerts. Concerts in 2007 included Vince Gill with wife Amy Grant, Trisha Yearwood and Reba McEntire. Superstar duo Montgomery Gentry concluded the 2007 calendar in October at the Spa Resort Casino in downtown Palm Springs. 2008 concluded with Wynonna Judd who appeared for a holiday concert at the McCallum Theatre in December; 2009 began with Josh Turner at the McCallum and Brooks & Dunn at Fantasy Springs Resort Casino in Indio, both in February.

Other key on-air personnel include news director Jeff Michaels, production manager and nighttime talent Nick Summers, promotions manager Kory James and program director Al Gordon. (Nick Summers is now at the Alpha Media cluster in Palm Springs)
