= Valerie Jean Dates =

Coordinates: 33.5688°N 116.1810°W

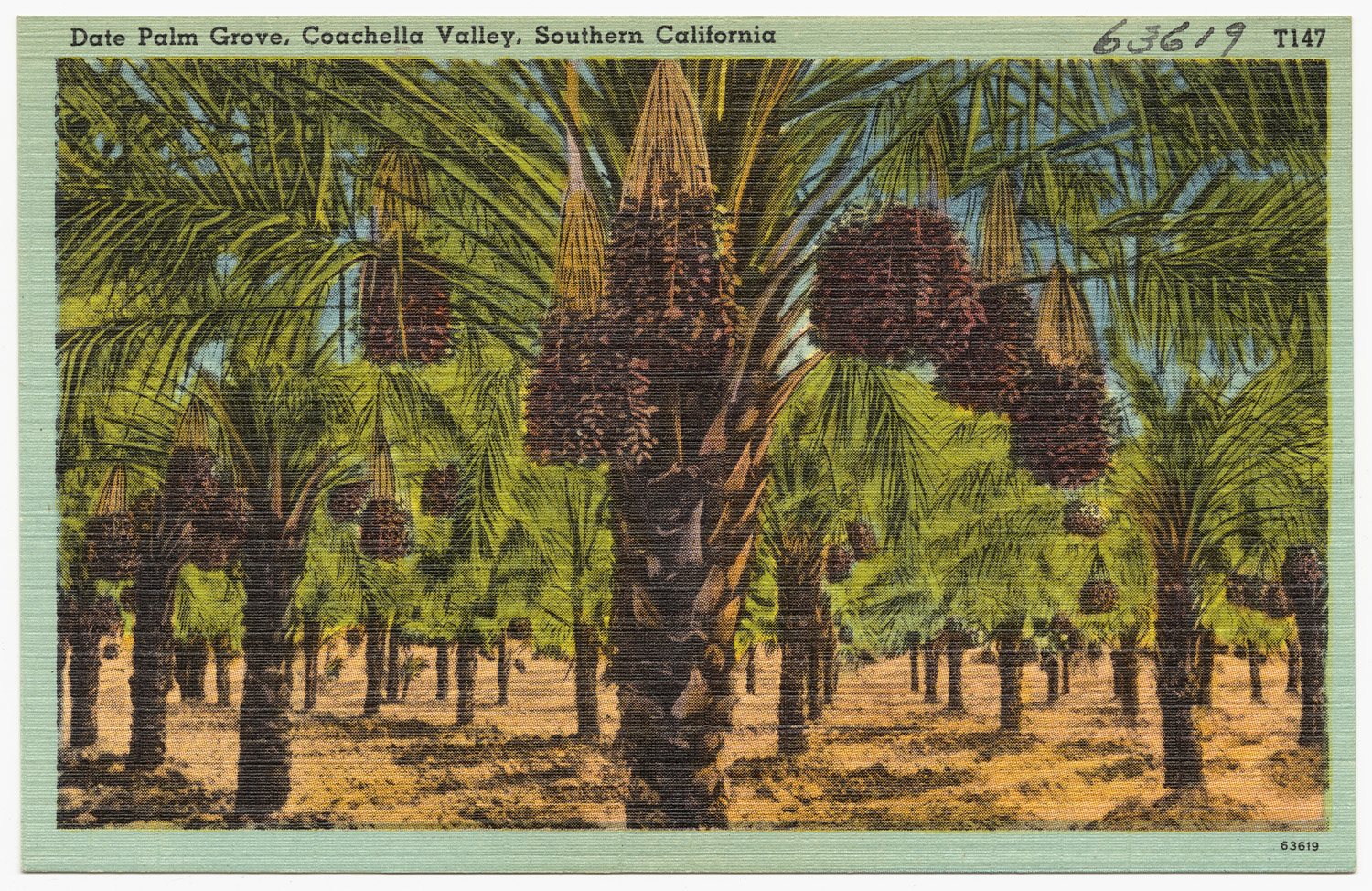
- Date Palm Groves, Coachella Valley c. 1930
- Interactive map of Valerie Jean Dates
- Location: Harrison Street & 66th Ave; Valerie, CA
- Owner: Russell Charles Nicoll
- Operator: Nicoll Family

Construction
- Groundbreaking: 1926
- Opened: 1928

Valerie Jean Dates is a historic date orchard and onetime popular U.S. Route 99 tourist stop located in Valerie, California, an unincorporated area a short distance south of Thermal.

Founded in 1928 by Russell Charles Nicoll and located on present-day Harrison Street at Avenue 66, the orchard is especially noteworthy as being the first to market dates directly to consumers. It was named in honor of his daughter Valerie Jean Nicoll. They are also responsible for being the first to market dates via mail order, for the creation of coconut- and almond-stuffed dates and for the creation of the date milkshake.

The business has been closed for some time, and as of at least 2009, all of the signs are gone and the building has fallen into poor condition. The site was added to the roster of the California Office of Historic Preservation on February 11, 1991.

== Pictures ==
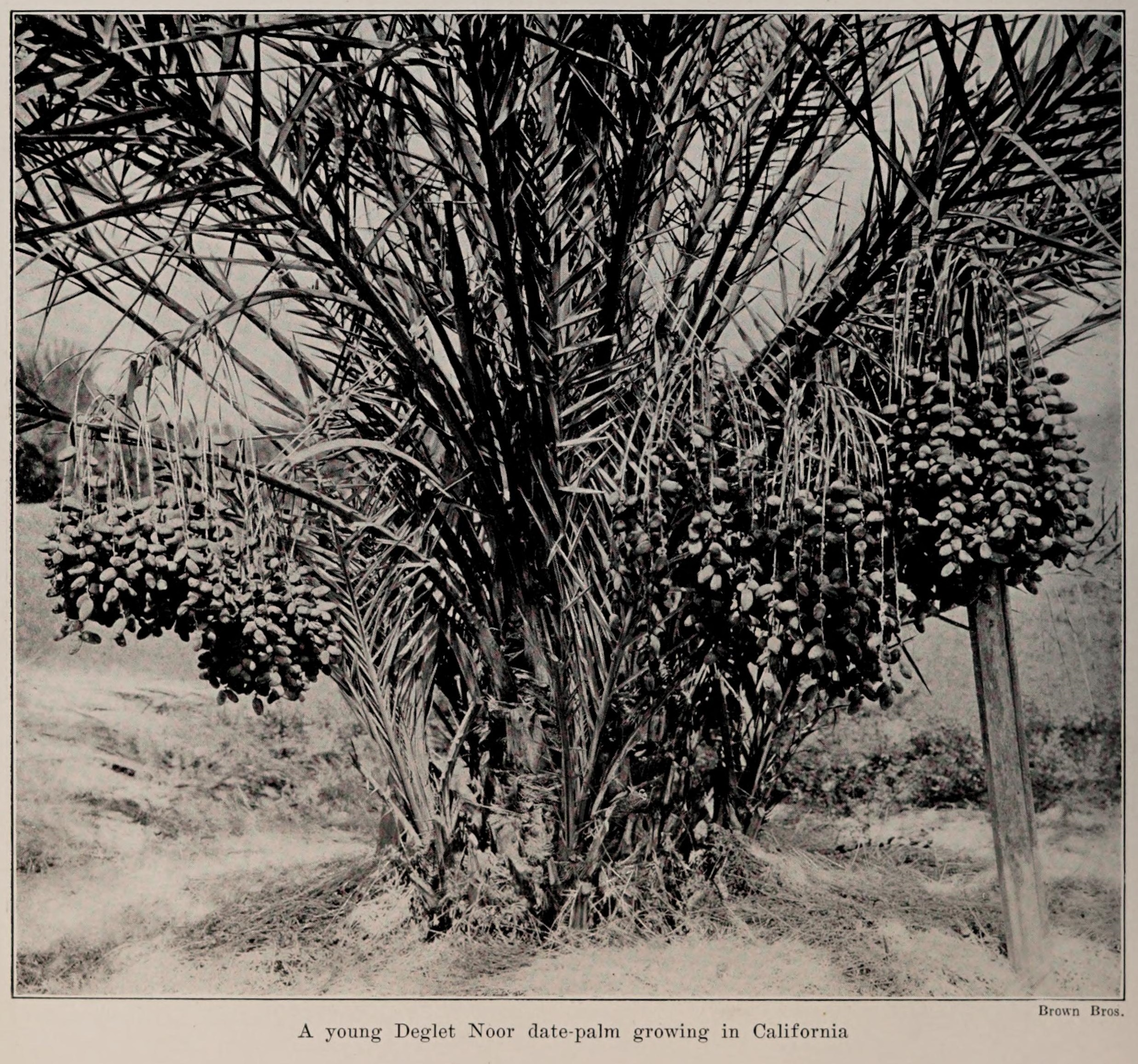
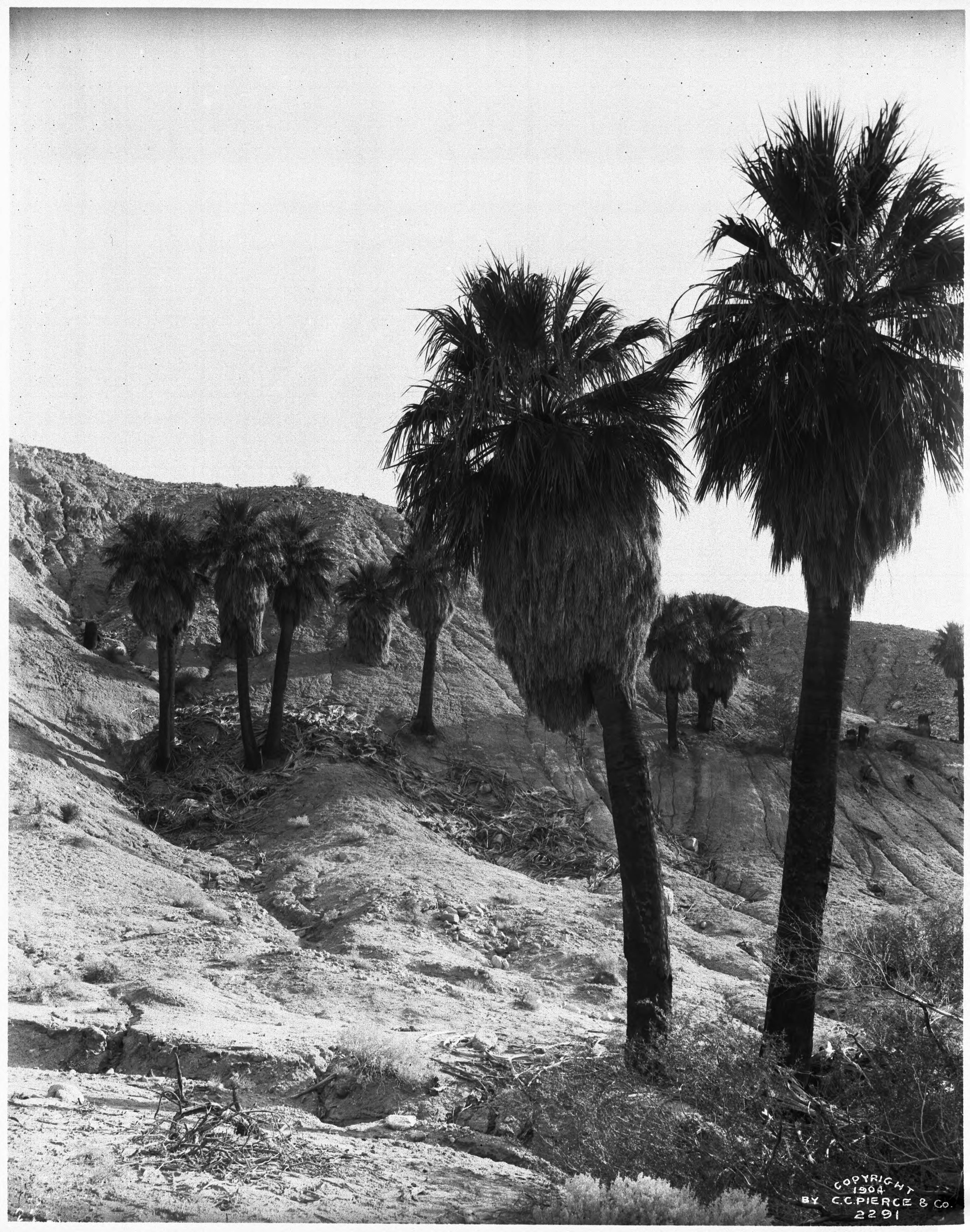
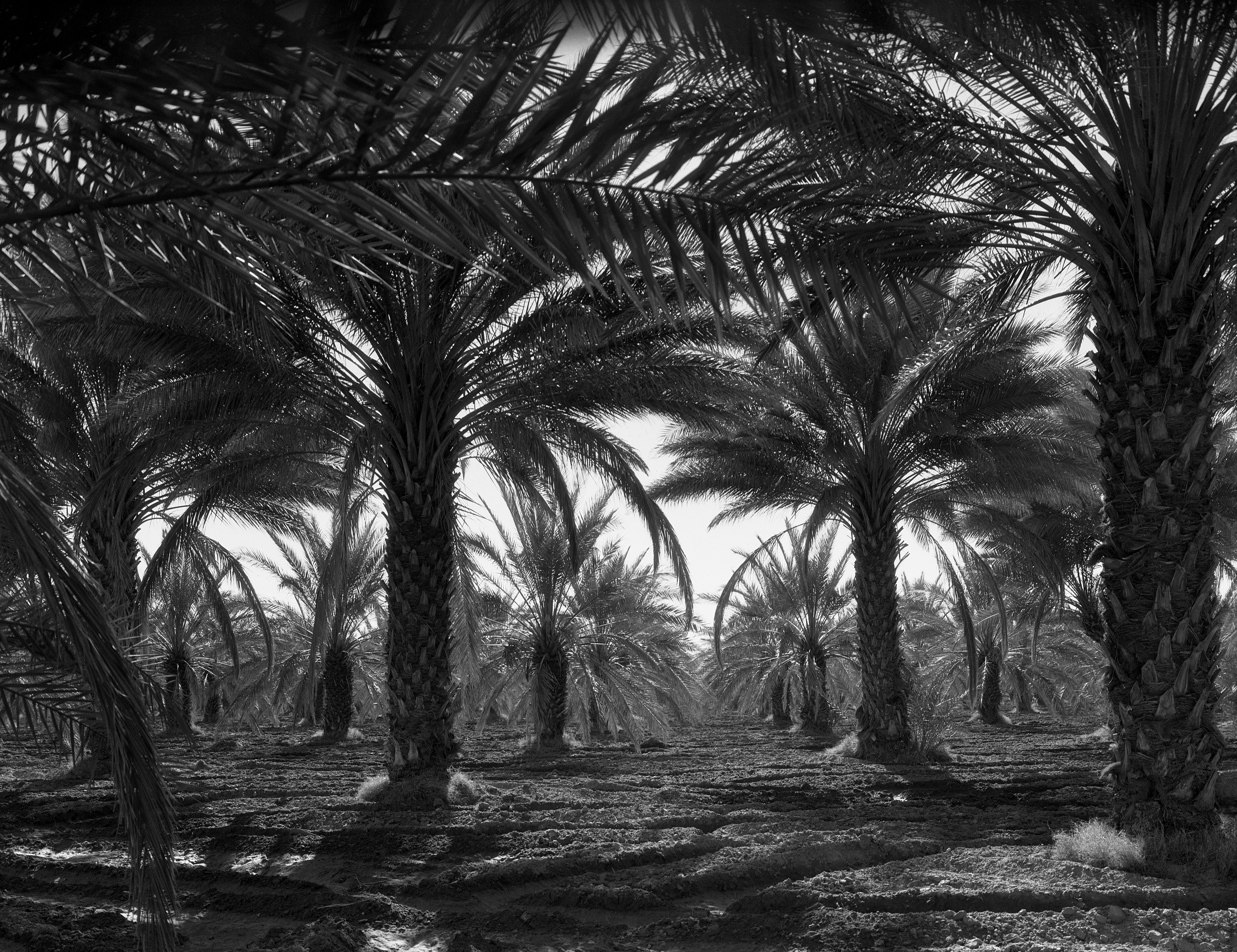
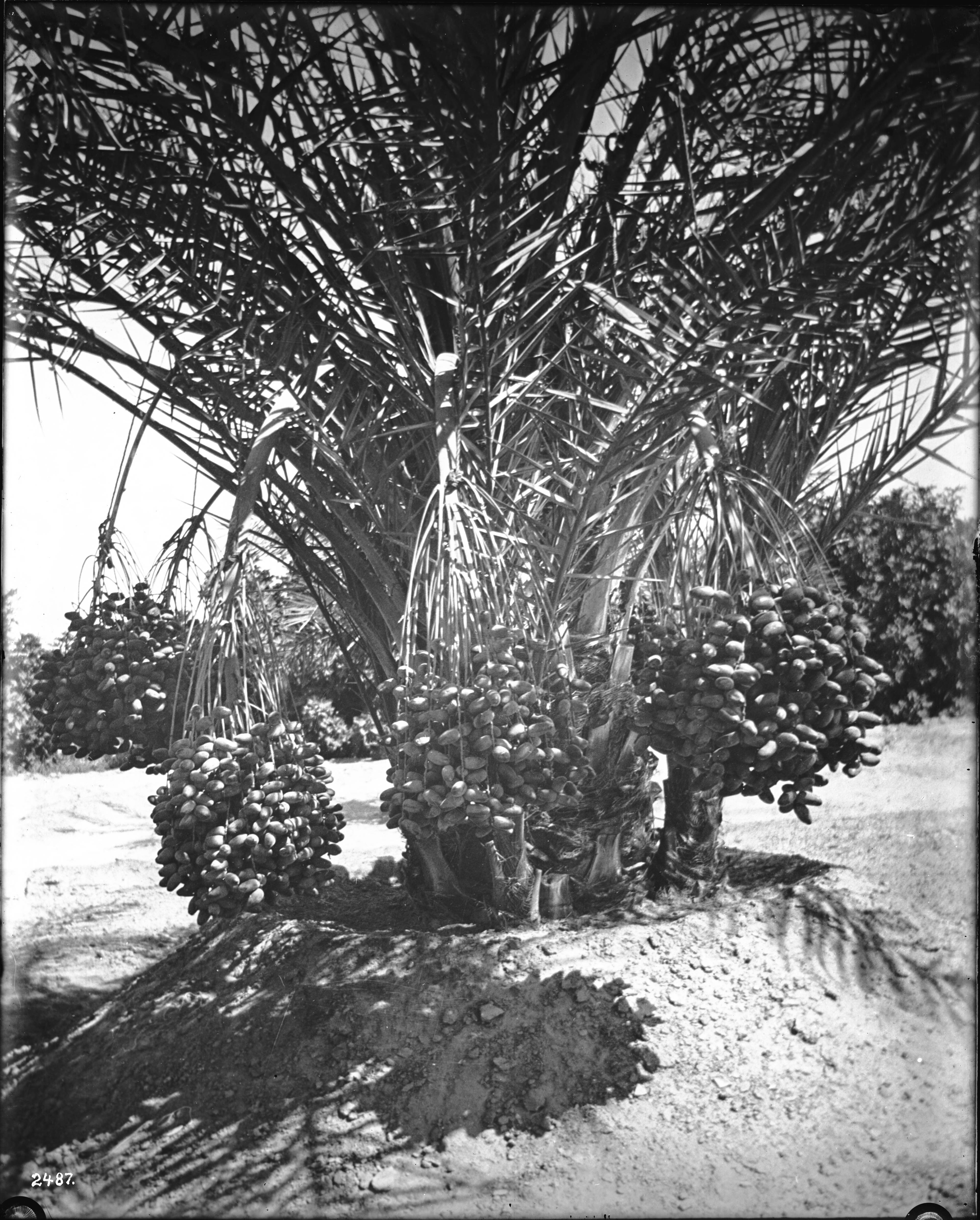
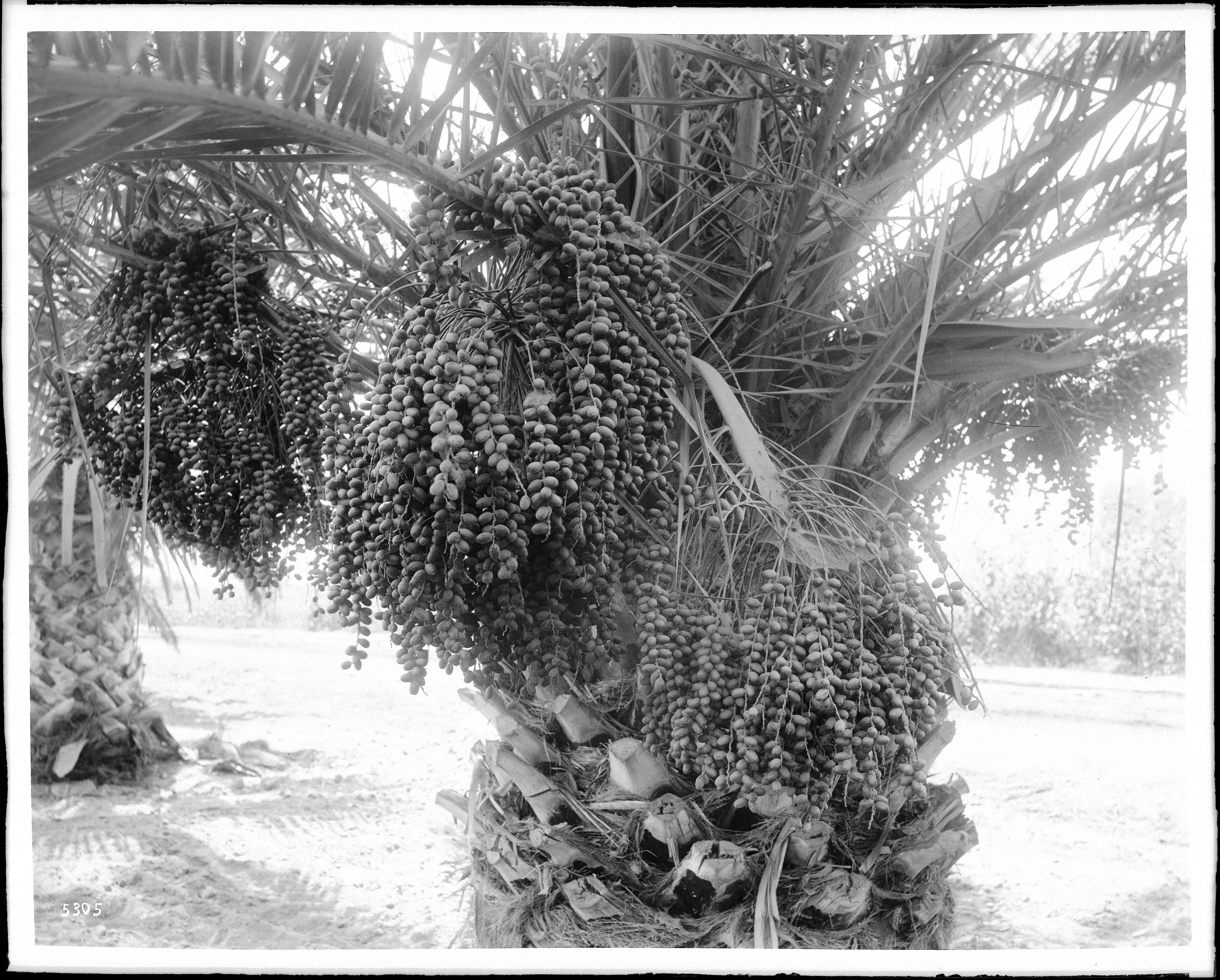

== See also ==
- Shields Date Gardens
