= KPSF =

Radio station in Cathedral City, California (2012–2025)

- Cathedral City, California; United States
- Broadcast area: Palm Springs, California
- Frequency: 1200 kHz

Ownership
- Owner: Ronald Cohen; (CRC Media West, LLC)
- Sister stations: KXPS

History
- First air date: March 5, 2012
- Last air date: December 15, 2025

Technical information
- Facility ID: 161373
- Class: B
- Power: 5,000 watts (day); 1,300 watts (night)
- Transmitter coordinates: 33°50′35.1″N 116°25′42″W

KPSF (1200 AM) was a radio station licensed to Cathedral City, California, United States. KPSF signed on March 5, 2012. The station shared its transmitter site with sister station KXPS.

On July 11, 2019, KPSF changed their format from business talk to Christian radio, branded as "Pure Radio".

On June 1, 2022, KPSF and KXPS went silent.

On April 22, 2024 the station resumed operations. The Federal Communications Commission cancelled the station’s license on December 15, 2025.
