= Indio, California =

- City
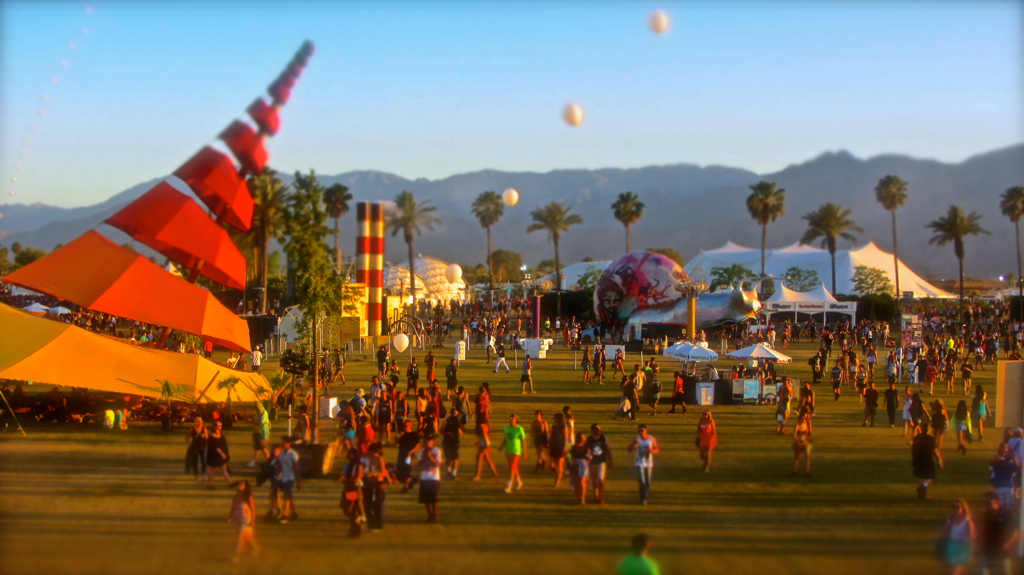
- Coachella Valley Music and Arts Festival

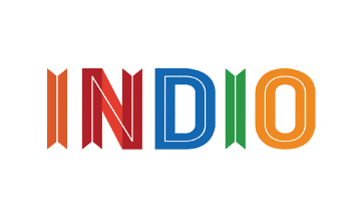
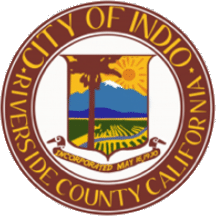
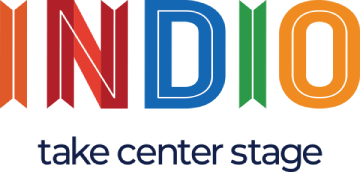
- Flag Seal Logo
- Nickname: The City of Festivals
- Motto(s): "take center stage," "The Place to Be"
- Interactive map of Indio, California
- Location in the United States Indio (California) Indio (the United States)
- Coordinates: 33°43′14″N 116°12′56″W
- Country: United States
- State: California
- County: Riverside
- Native American Reservation (partial): Twenty-Nine Palms Band of Mission Indians & Cabazon Band of Mission Indians
- Incorporated: May 16, 1930

Government
  - Type: City Council–City Manager
  - Mayor: Elaine Holmes
  - Mayor Pro Tem: Waymond Fermon
  - City Council: Oscar Ortiz; Benjamin Guitron; Glenn Miller

Area
  - City: 33.24 sq mi (86.08 km^{2})
  - Land: 33.23 sq mi (86.06 km^{2})
  - Water: 0.0077 sq mi (0.02 km^{2}) 0.02%
- Elevation: −13 ft (−4 m)

Population (2020)
  - City: 89,137
  - Rank: 82nd in California
  - Density: 2,683/sq mi (1,036/km^{2})
  - Urban: 361,075 (US: 114th)
  - Urban density: 2,378/sq mi (918.3/km^{2})
- Time zone: UTC−8 (Pacific)
  - Summer (DST): UTC−7 (PDT)
- ZIP Codes: 92201–92203
- Area codes: 442/760
- FIPS code: 06-36448
- GNIS feature IDs: 1652727, 2410101
- Website: indio.org

Indio (Spanish for "Indian") is a city in central Riverside County, California, United States, in the Coachella Valley of Southern California's Colorado Desert region. Indio is approximately 125 miles (201 km) east of Los Angeles, 23 miles (37 km) east of Palm Springs, and 98 miles (158 km) west of Blythe, California.

The population was 89,137 at the 2020 United States census, up from 76,036 at the 2010 census, an increase of 17%. Indio is the most populous city in the Coachella Valley, and was formerly referred to as the "Hub of the Valley," a Chamber of Commerce slogan used in the mid-twentieth century. Indio is now nicknamed the "City of Festivals," a reference to the numerous cultural events held in the city, most notably the Coachella Valley Music and Arts Festival and Stagecoach Festival.

Indio is the principal city of an urban area defined by the United States Census Bureau that is located in the Coachella Valley: the Indio–Palm Desert–Palm Springs CA urban area had a population of 361,075 as of the 2020 census, making it the 114th-most populous urban area in the United States.

== History ==
Railroad line construction east out of Los Angeles began in 1873. Trains were operated to Colton on July 16, 1875, and to Indio (then known as Indian Wells) on May 29, 1876. Moving on eastward from Indio, the railroad reached the west bank of the Colorado River opposite Yuma on May 23, 1877. Back then, Yuma was a village known as Arizona City prior to 1873. There was a delay in getting military authority to lay tracks across the Yuma Indian reservation, and it was September that year before the bridge was completed so trains could operate into Yuma. The Southern Pacific Railroad was to have joined those of the Texas & Pacific, one of several railroads then holding, or seeking, federal authority to build lines from various sections of the country west to the Pacific Coast. But the rail-head of the T & P was at a standstill far off in Texas, so Southern Pacific continued building eastward.

The City of Indio came about because of the need for a halfway point for the Southern Pacific Railroad between Yuma, Arizona and Los Angeles, since the engines needed to be refilled with water. Since other areas had the name Indian Wells, Indio (after a Spanish variation of the word "Indian") was chosen instead. After the railroad's arrival in 1876, Indio began to grow. The first permanent building was the craftsman-style Southern Pacific Depot station and hotel. Southern Pacific tried to make life as comfortable as it could for their workers to keep them from leaving such a difficult area to live in at the time. The depot was at the center of all social life in the desert with a fancy dining room and hosting dances on Friday nights.

While Indio started as a railroad town, it soon became an agricultural center. Onions, cotton, grapes, citrus and dates thrived in the arid climate due to the ingenuity of farmers finding various means of attaining water, first through artesian wells and later through the valley's branch of the All-American Canal. However, water also was a major problem for Indio and the city was flooded several times until the storm water canals were created throughout the Coachella Valley.

Businessmen and women found this last frontier land of the continental United States as an ideal place to start fresh. Dr. Harry Smiley and his wife Nell were early residents and stayed in Indio after their car broke down on the way to Los Angeles and became people of influence and helped shape the area. A. G. Tingman was an early store owner and first Postmaster of Indio, but also well known for taking advantage of miners as they headed to the mountains, selling at rather high prices. Later Dr. June Robertson McCarroll became a leading philanthropist and successful doctor in Indio. She was responsible along with the Indio Woman's Club for pressuring California into adopting the placing of white lines down the streets after she was nearly hit one too many times by passing vehicles. Even though these early founders of the city are considered pioneers, they still partook in the lifestyles of their friends living in such areas as Los Angeles.

By the turn of the 20th century, Indio continued to grow. Schools were built, the La Casita hospital provided medical services, and families established roots. By 1920, about one to two thousand year-round residents lived in Indio, while it ballooned from 2,500 to 5,000 during the winter months and was advertised as a health resort for senior citizens and those with respiratory diseases and ailments in the rest of the 20th century.

Indio also served as the home of the USDA's Date Station, a place where leading scientific research was taking place on the fruit that would become a major part of the culture of Indio. The station started in 1907 and was responsible for the ability of local farmers to better understand this unique crop and make the Coachella Valley a leader in American date crops. This also created a tie to the Middle East that led to the theme for the County Fair with the Middle Eastern flair known as the Riverside County Fair and National Date Festival .

By the 1920s nearby towns Coachella and Thermal remained larger than Indio, though Indio became known as the "Hub of the Valley" as a center of commerce. After a large fire burned much of Thermal and with a period of relative decline in Coachella, Indio once again grew. In 1930, Indio incorporated as a city. On September 6, 1930, storekeeper Fred Kohler received the first business license in Indio.

During the Second World War, Indio was also aided by the visiting soldiers from General George S. Patton's desert training grounds across southeastern California and headquartered in the remote station of Chiriaco Summit located 30 miles to the east.

From the middle to second half of the 20th century, Indio's development was fairly idle as populations began to move into the newer cities of Palm Desert and La Quinta. There is now a reversal in this trend where Indio experienced a population boom beginning in the 1980s, with the population doubling twice over and currently has over 100,000 residents in the year 2025.

== Geography ==
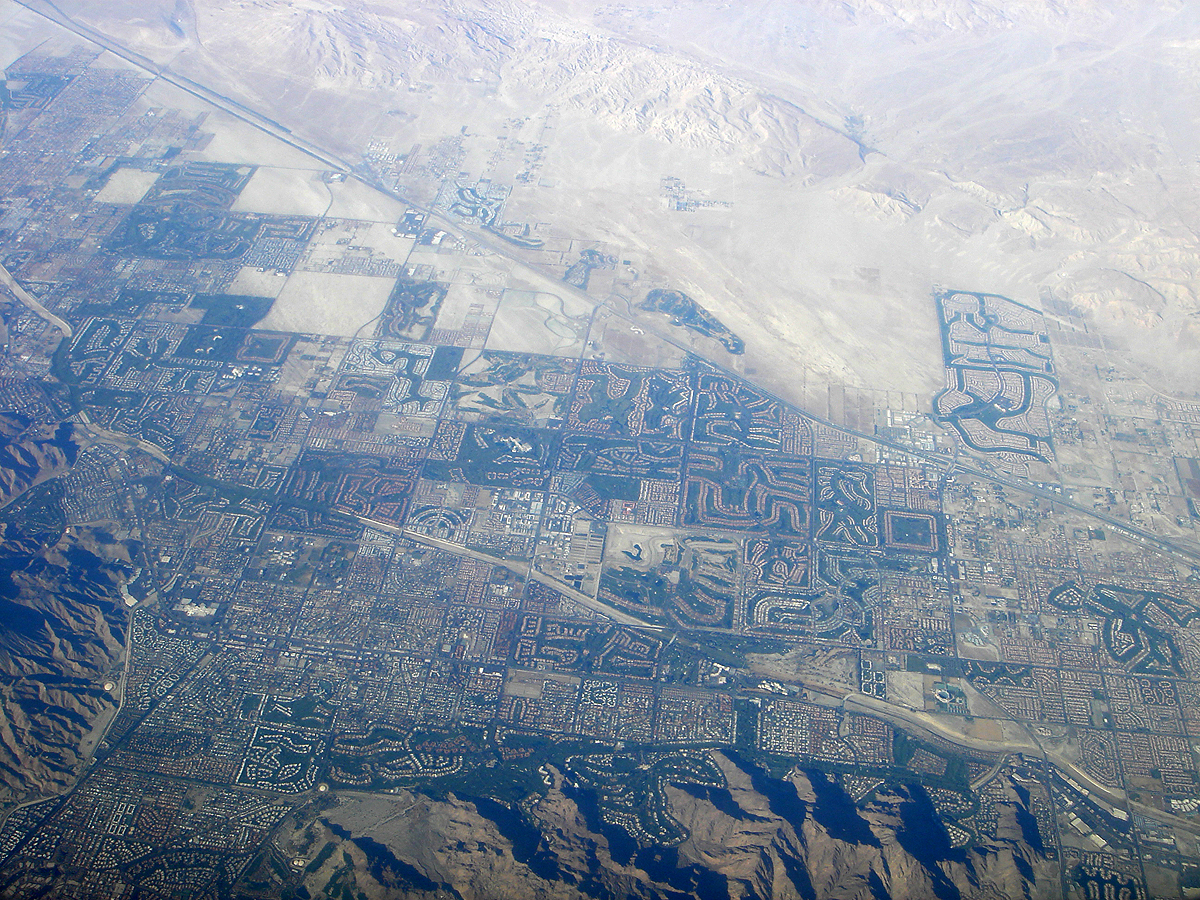
Aerial shot of the Coachella Valley

According to the United States Census Bureau, the city has a total area of 86.1 square kilometers (33 sq mi), 99.98% of which is land and 0.02% is water. The official elevation of Indio is below sea level; the city hall is 14 feet (4 m) below sea level, as the eastern half of the Coachella Valley drops as low as 150 feet (50 m) below sea level (the lakeshore of the Salton Sea is 15 miles (24 km) south of Indio). About 3 miles (5 km) north and east of Indio is the San Andreas Fault, a major tectonic plate boundary of the Pacific and North American plates.

The telephone area code is 760 but 442 has been added to the area as well. The city's ZIP codes are 92201 and 92203 north of Interstate 10.

=== Climate ===
The climate of the Coachella Valley is influenced by the surrounding geography. High mountain ranges on three sides contribute to its unique and year-round warm climate, with some of warmest winters west of the Rocky Mountains. Indio has a warm winter/hot summer desert climate (Köppen: BWh): Its average annual high temperature is 89.5 °F (31.9 °C) and average annual low is 62.1 °F (16.7 °C) but summer highs above 108 °F (42.2 °C) are common and sometimes exceed 120 °F (48.9 °C), while summer night lows often stay above 82 °F (27.8 °C). Monsoon related thunderstorms can occur in the summer months. In September 1939, a thunderstorm from the remains of a tropical storm, brought more than 6" of rain in less than 24 hours. Winters are warm with daytime highs often between 68–86 °F (20–30 °C). Under 4 inches (101.6 mm) of annual precipitation are average, with over 348 days of sunshine per year. The hottest temperature ever recorded there was 125 °F (51.7 °C) on July 6, 1905. The mean annual temperature is 76 °F (24.4 °C).

Climate data for Indio, California, 1991–2020 normals, extremes 1894–present
Month	Jan	Feb	Mar	Apr	May	Jun	Jul	Aug	Sep	Oct	Nov	Dec	Year
Record high °F (°C)	97 (36)	100 (38)	107 (42)	110 (43)	121 (49)	123 (51)	125 (52)	121 (49)	122 (50)	115 (46)	101 (38)	96 (36)	125 (52)
Mean maximum °F (°C)	82.2 (27.9)	86.0 (30.0)	93.1 (33.9)	101.1 (38.4)	105.7 (40.9)	112.9 (44.9)	115.5 (46.4)	115.1 (46.2)	111.7 (44.3)	103.0 (39.4)	91.7 (33.2)	80.5 (26.9)	117.4 (47.4)
Mean daily maximum °F (°C)	70.3 (21.3)	73.3 (22.9)	79.9 (26.6)	85.8 (29.9)	93.1 (33.9)	101.7 (38.7)	105.8 (41.0)	105.2 (40.7)	100.8 (38.2)	90.5 (32.5)	78.0 (25.6)	68.8 (20.4)	87.8 (31.0)
Daily mean °F (°C)	58.6 (14.8)	62.2 (16.8)	68.5 (20.3)	74.5 (23.6)	81.2 (27.3)	89.2 (31.8)	94.1 (34.5)	93.8 (34.3)	88.7 (31.5)	78.1 (25.6)	65.5 (18.6)	57.0 (13.9)	76.0 (24.4)
Mean daily minimum °F (°C)	46.8 (8.2)	51.0 (10.6)	57.2 (14.0)	63.1 (17.3)	69.3 (20.7)	76.6 (24.8)	82.5 (28.1)	82.5 (28.1)	76.5 (24.7)	65.8 (18.8)	53.0 (11.7)	45.3 (7.4)	64.1 (17.8)
Mean minimum °F (°C)	36.1 (2.3)	39.3 (4.1)	44.3 (6.8)	52.0 (11.1)	58.3 (14.6)	64.4 (18.0)	72.9 (22.7)	73.0 (22.8)	65.6 (18.7)	53.7 (12.1)	41.1 (5.1)	34.7 (1.5)	33.6 (0.9)
Record low °F (°C)	13 (−11)	20 (−7)	25 (−4)	33 (1)	38 (3)	45 (7)	59 (15)	56 (13)	46 (8)	31 (−1)	23 (−5)	17 (−8)	13 (−11)
Average precipitation inches (mm)	0.65 (17)	0.59 (15)	0.32 (8.1)	0.07 (1.8)	0.02 (0.51)	0.00 (0.00)	0.05 (1.3)	0.26 (6.6)	0.13 (3.3)	0.15 (3.8)	0.19 (4.8)	0.49 (12)	2.92 (74)
Average precipitation days (≥ 0.01 in)	2.4	1.8	1.2	0.3	0.1	0.0	0.7	0.4	0.6	0.4	0.8	2.0	10.7
Source: NOAA

=== Nature and wildlife ===
Indio is in the Colorado Desert region of the Sonoran Desert. It is adjacent to the geologic Salton Sink and within the site of historic Lake Cahuilla of the Lower Colorado River Valley. Indio is an official National Bird Sanctuary, because of the seasonal bird migration flight routes that cross the town en route to the Salton Sea.

- Geography of the Colorado Desert
- Fauna of the Colorado Desert
- Sonoran Desert wildflowers

== Demographics ==
Historical population
Census	Pop.	Note	%±
1940	2,296		—
1950	5,300		130.8%
1960	9,745		83.9%
1970	14,459		48.4%
1980	21,611		49.5%
1990	36,793		70.3%
2000	49,116		33.5%
2010	76,036		54.8%
2020	89,137		17.2%
2024 (est.)	94,275	▲	5.8%
U.S. Decennial Census

=== Racial and ethnic composition ===
Indio city, California – Racial and ethnic composition Note: the US Census treats Hispanic/Latino as an ethnic category. This table excludes Latinos from the racial categories and assigns them to a separate category. Hispanics/Latinos may be of any race.
Race / Ethnicity (NH = Non-Hispanic)	Pop 1980	Pop 1990	Pop 2000	Pop 2010	Pop 2020	% 1980	% 1990	% 2000	% 2010	% 2020
White alone (NH)	7,962	9,983	9,586	20,512	21,474	36.84%	27.12%	19.52%	26.98%	24.09%
Black or African American alone (NH)	975	1,158	1,199	1,521	1,802	4.51%	3.15%	2.44%	2.00%	2.02%
Native American or Alaska Native alone (NH)	104	111	192	209	284	0.48%	0.30%	0.39%	0.27%	0.32%
Asian alone (NH)	340	390	631	1,467	1,988	1.57%	1.05%	1.28%	1.93%	2.23%
Native Hawaiian or Pacific Islander alone (NH)	340	390	19	40	48	1.57%	1.05%	0.04%	0.05%	0.05%
Other Race alone (NH)	131	83	48	91	357	0.61%	0.23%	0.10%	0.12%	0.40%
Mixed race or Multiracial (NH)	x	x	413	656	1,578	x	x	0.84%	0.86%	1.77%
Hispanic or Latino (any race)	12,099	25,068	37,028	51,540	61,606	55.99%	68.13%	75.39%	67.78%	69.11%
Total	21,611	36,793	49,116	76,036	89,137	100.00%	100.00%	100.00%	100.00%	100.00%

=== 2020 census ===
As of the 2020 census, Indio had a population of 89,137. The population density was 2,682.7 people per square mile. The median age was 37.2 years. 25.3% of residents were under the age of 18 and 17.8% of residents were 65 years of age or older. For every 100 females there were 95.4 males, and for every 100 females age 18 and over there were 92.7 males age 18 and over.

99.5% of residents lived in urban areas, while 0.5% lived in rural areas.

There were 28,744 households in Indio, of which 38.3% had children under the age of 18 living in them. Of all households, 52.4% were married-couple households, 14.4% were households with a male householder and no spouse or partner present, and 26.2% were households with a female householder and no spouse or partner present. About 19.2% of all households were made up of individuals and 11.1% had someone living alone who was 65 years of age or older.

There were 34,638 housing units, of which 17.0% were vacant. The homeowner vacancy rate was 1.8% and the rental vacancy rate was 5.3%.

=== 2023 ACS estimates ===
In 2023, the US Census Bureau estimated that 25.3% of the population were foreign-born. Of all people aged 5 or older, 46.3% spoke only English at home, 50.0% spoke Spanish, 1.1% spoke other Indo-European languages, 1.9% spoke Asian or Pacific Islander languages, and 0.7% spoke other languages. Of those aged 25 or older, 75.4% were high school graduates and 21.1% had a bachelor's degree.

The median household income in 2023 was $78,709, and the per capita income was $35,231. About 9.1% of families and 11.6% of the population were below the poverty line.

=== 2010 census ===
The 2010 United States census reported that Indio had a population of 76,036. The population density was 2,604.9 inhabitants per square mile (1,005.8/km^{2}). The racial makeup of Indio was 46,735 (61.5%) White (27.0% Non-Hispanic White), 1,805 (2.4%) African American, 741 (1.0%) Native American, 1,693 (2.2%) Asian, 55 (0.1%) Pacific Islander, 22,394 (29.5%) from other races, and 2,613 (3.4%) from two or more races. There were 51,540 Hispanic or Latino residents, of any race (67.8%).

There were 23,378 households, out of which 10,522 (45.0%) had children under the age of 18 living in them, 13,149 (56.2%) were opposite-sex married couples living together, 3,578 (15.3%) had a female householder with no husband present, 1,512 (6.5%) had a male householder with no wife present. There were 1,654 (7.1%) unmarried opposite-sex partnerships, and 232 (1.0%) same-sex married couples or partnerships; 3,859 households (16.5%) were made up of individuals, and 1,777 (7.6%) had someone living alone who was 65 years of age or older. The average household size was 3.21. There were 18,239 families (78.0% of all households); the average family size was 3.60.

There were 22,879 residents (30.1%) under the age of 18, 7,247 (9.5%) aged 18 to 24, 20,705 (27.2%) aged 25 to 44, 15,793 (20.8%) aged 45 to 64, and 9,412 (12.4%) who were 65 years of age or older. The median age was 32.2 years. For every 100 females, there were 97.3 males. For every 100 females age 18 and over, there were 94.5 males.

There were 28,971 housing units at an average density of 992.5 per square mile (383.2/km^{2}), of which 15,274 (65.3%) were owner-occupied, and 8,104 (34.7%) were occupied by renters. The homeowner vacancy rate was 5.0%; the rental vacancy rate was 12.5%, while 46,780 people (61.5% of the population) lived in owner-occupied housing units and 28,307 people (37.2%) lived in rental housing units.

During 2009–2013, Indio had a median household income of $50,068, with 21.9% of the population living below the federal poverty line.

=== Population growth ===
Beginning in the 1980s and to today, Indio grew many times its previous size. Along with the rest of the surrounding area, Indio became a choice for thousands of new residents per year.

The 2010 United States census recorded the city's population to be about 76,000 residents, though this did not account for seasonal residents.

== Economy ==
Two major contributions to the local economy are year-round agriculture and tourism, although the majority of tourist activity is seasonal, between October and May.

=== Agriculture ===
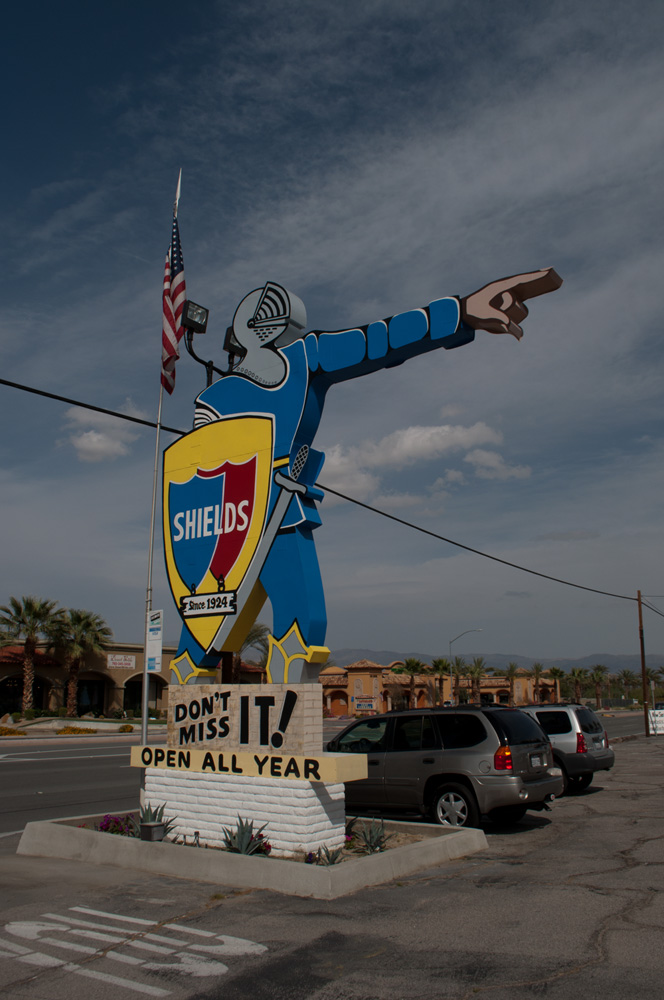
Entrance sign of the Shields Date Garden in Indio

One can visit Shields Date Gardens, a date grower that maintains a large retail store along State Highway 111. There are citrus groves and vegetable fields surrounding the city limits, but rapid development of new housing tracts and golf courses in the "East Valley" in the 1990s and 2000s has displaced most of the agricultural space.

=== Employment and job growth ===
Indio has increasingly served as a magnet of job opportunities for immigrants and newcomers from parts of California and across the nation. Jobs in fields such as agriculture, construction, hospitality, maintenance, and retail and housekeeping are highly sought after in the area.

Construction and government are among the largest employment sectors in Indio, with a higher proportion of workers in these industries in Indio than the rest of the Coachella Valley.

In addition to construction and government, a 2019 study revealed that the top five employment industries in Indio are educational services, entertainment services, wholesale/retail, agriculture/mining/construction, and waste services. Between 2007 and 2015, the percentage of retail trade jobs in Indio increased by 4.4 percent and the percentage of education jobs increased from 15.2 to 20.5 percent.

As the secondary seat of government for Riverside County, California, Indio has many county offices and employs more than a thousand county employees. The California Superior Court's Larson Justice Center, Riverside County's Law Library and District Attorney's office, numerous law firms along Highway 111, and the California Desert Trial Academy (CDTA) College of Law (the only law school in Riverside County), located at 45290 Fargo Street, have made Downtown Indio the center for law and legal studies in the Coachella Valley.

The average salary for a job in Indio increased from $28,224 in 2003 to $35,532 in 2015. The City of Indio is constantly expanding to see the number of jobs and average salaries rise. It is currently in the process of a 2040 general plan to increase the number of developments in Indio. For example, the city opened a 120-room Fairfield Inn and Suites in February 2019 and a 93-room Hampton Inn and Suites in July 2020. A new movie theater and the continual development of retail stores at the Indio Towne Center, The Showcase at Indio, and The Palms shopping centers is also anticipated to create an abundance of jobs.

Light industry is not new to Indio. Between the 1960s and the early 1980s, the Bank of America-owned Giannini Research Institute, Kaiser Inc. and Cabazon Firearms had contracts with both NASA and the US Armed Forces that produced ammunition, computer parts, moon rover parts for the Apollo landing program, and train engines for the Southern Pacific Railroad. Indio sought more corporate businesses and office professions, including fruit packing and shipping firms. Locally based United States Filter Corporation, Guy Evans Inc., Dimare Fruit Co., West Coast Turf and Japanese-owned Sun World Inc.; and move-in companies such as Borden, Coca-Cola, Ernie Ball, Ernst and Young, Ferguson, Fulton Distributors, Guthy-Renker, Pulte Homes, Sunrise Company, SunScape Tech and Tala Industries choose Indio for the location of transport routes, low economic costs, and growth potential.

Indio is home to Buzz Box Premium Cocktails, Ring Power Corporation, Triangle Distributing Company (formerly Heimark), The Forager Project, and Purus International. Other companies in Indio include Pepsi Cola Distributing, RDO Equipment, Sepulveda Building Materials, Fortun Foods, Arctic Glacier, A.C. Houston Lumber Company, and Commercial Lighting Industry.

=== Top employers ===
According to the city's 2024 Annual Comprehensive Financial Report, the top employers in the city are:

#	Employer	# of Employees
1	Desert Sands Unified School District	3,048
2	County of Riverside	1,391
3	Fantasy Springs Resort Casino	1,135
4	John F. Kennedy Memorial Hospital	625
5	Walmart Supercenter	399
6	City of Indio	254
7	Ralphs	151
8	WorldMark Indio Resort	146
9	Fiesta Ford	143
10	Desert Springs Health Care & Wellness	138

=== Native American gaming ===
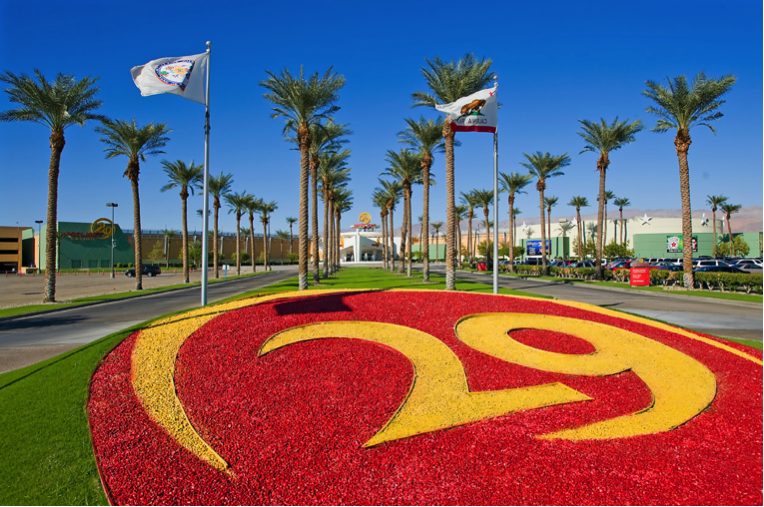
Entrance to Spotlight 29 Casino

Two Native American owned casinos in and near Indio are the Fantasy Springs Resort Casino, owned by the Cabazon Band of Mission Indians, and the Spotlight 29 Casino, owned by the Twenty-Nine Palms Band of Mission Indians. Spotlight 29 formerly was "Trump 29" when it was partly owned by then-businessman Donald Trump for a brief period of time in the 2000s.

== Arts and culture ==
=== Annual events ===
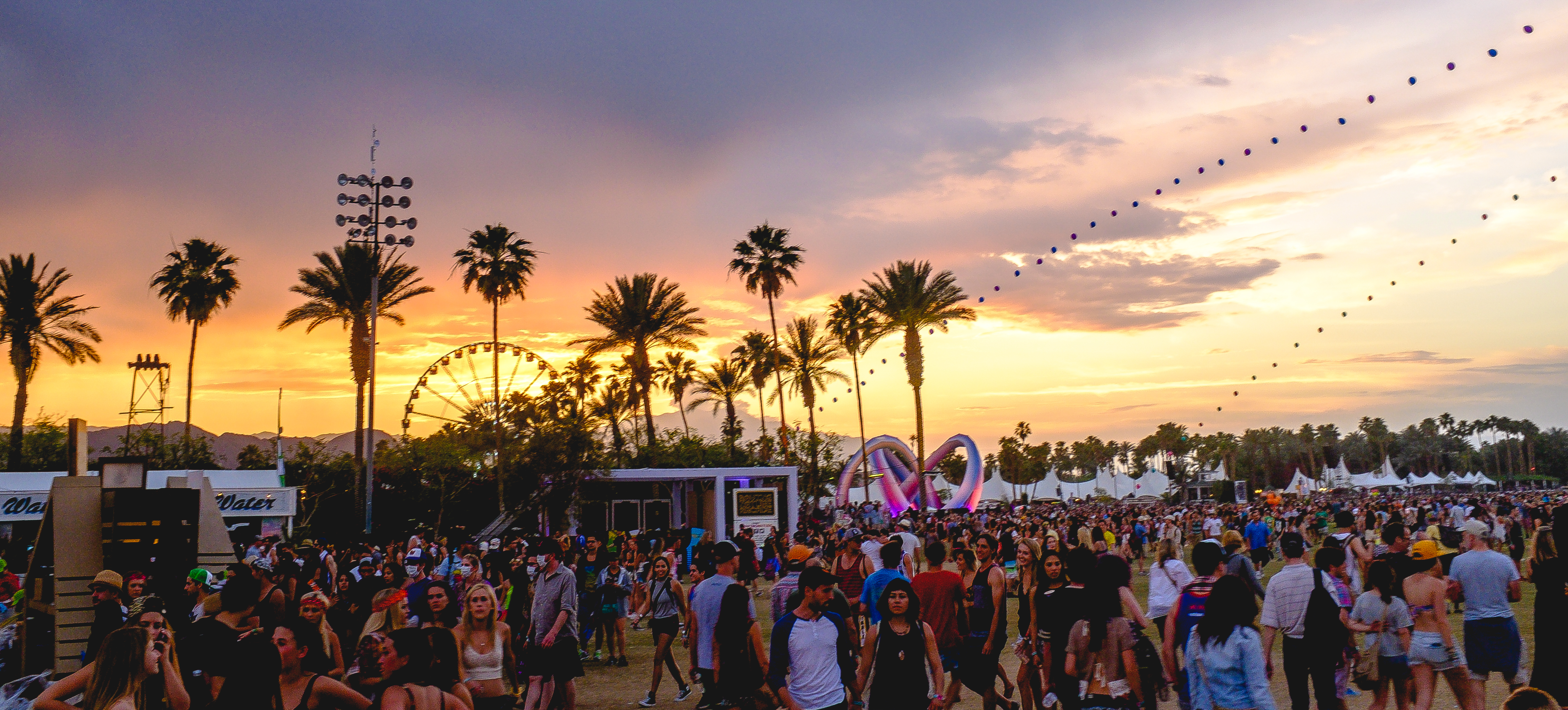
The festival grounds of the Coachella Valley Music and Arts Festival in 2014

Because of the numerous festivals and special events held annually in Indio, the Chamber of Commerce deemed Indio's official nickname to be "The City of Festivals". Indio is considered the second County seat, the Riverside County Fairgrounds is a facility that hosts various events year round such as music concerts, 4x4 monster truck rallies, rodeos, and other special events.

Two major annual festivals are the Indio International Tamale Festival and the Riverside County Fair and National Date Festival and are held each February at the Riverside County Fairgrounds, located on Highway 111 in the heart of Indio. Since 1947, this festival has celebrated the date fruit crop of the Coachella Valley. The Tamale Festival is held each December on the streets of Old Town Indio and holds one Guinness World Record as the largest tamale festival (120,000 in attendance, Dec. 2–3, 2000) and once held the record for the world's largest tamale, [over 1 foot (0.3 m) in diameter and 40 feet (12.2 m) in length], created by Chef John Sedlar, but that record has since been surpassed.

In 1993, Paul Tollett, president of Goldenvoice, booked a Pearl Jam concert at the Empire Polo Club in Indio, and six years later, the Coachella Valley Music and Arts Festival was born. Since 2001, Coachella has been an annual event that has brought notable music acts to the desert, including: AC/DC, Red Hot Chili Peppers, Guns N' Roses, Prince, Paul McCartney, Lady Gaga, Beyoncé, Ariana Grande, Kanye West, Radiohead, Dr. Dre, Snoop Dogg, Pixies, The Cure, The White Stripes, Jay-Z, Tool, Beastie Boys, Jane's Addiction, Roger Waters and several others. Coachella extended the festival to three days in 2007. Organizers eliminated single-day tickets in 2010 and went to three-day passes only. The festival continues to draw large numbers of concertgoers to Indio and the Empire Polo Club, a venue that Rolling Stone said possessed a "lush beauty... that made the desert seem very far away."

In May 2007, Goldenvoice, promoters of Coachella, started Stagecoach, a three-day country music festival held the weekend following Coachella. Performers have included George Strait, Kenny Chesney, the Eagles, Sugarland, Taylor Swift, Carrie Underwood, Luke Bryan, Keith Urban, and Kid Rock.

In 2013, OC Weekly's Dave Barton described the arts scene in Indio with "seems to consist of Johnny Cash tributes, chalk art, camel and ostrich races, and Neil Simon revivals."

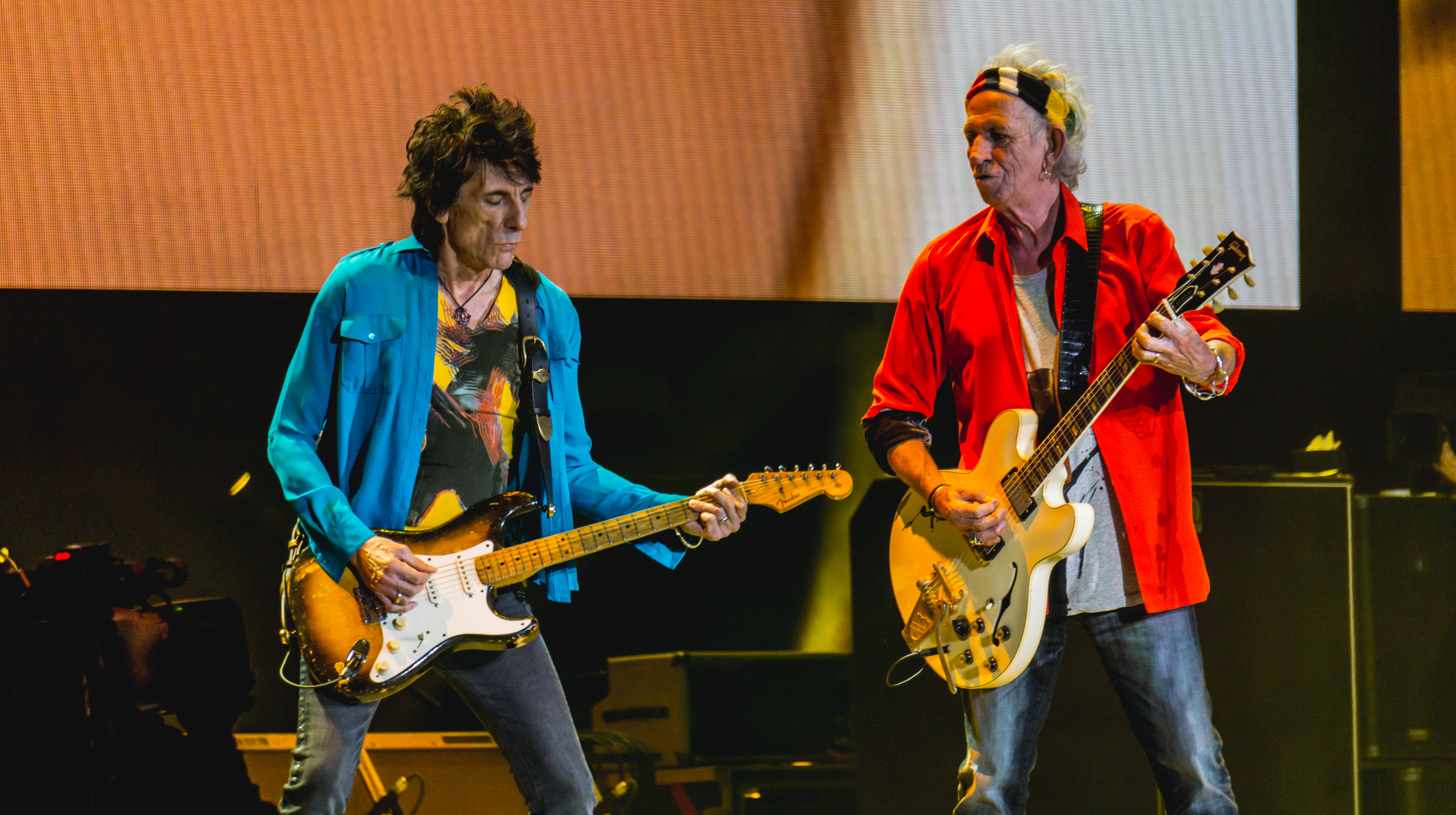
The Rolling Stones performing at Desert Trip on October 7, 2016

In 2016, Goldenvoice brought together The Rolling Stones, The Who, Paul McCartney, Bob Dylan, Roger Waters, and Neil Young for a 3-day mega concert known as Desert Trip. Desert Trip took place at the same venue as the Coachella Music Festival, over two three-day weekends, on October 7–9 and 14–16, 2016. Despite Desert Trip becoming the highest-grossing music festival in history, Goldenvoice founder Paul Tollett has not announced any plans for a second Desert Trip, stating that it's not necessary for it to "turn into another franchise festival".

Indio is also the site of many other annual arts, culture, and entertainment festivals and events. Among these include:

- The Southwest Arts Festival at the Empire Polo Club
- The Cabazon Indian National Pow wow at Fantasy Springs Resort and Casino
- The Palm Springs Kennel Club's Annual Dog Show and Rhythm at the Empire Polo Club
- The Heritage/Living History Festival at the Coachella Valley History Museum
- The Family Motor Coach Association's Annual Western Region RV Rally at the Riverside County Fairgrounds
- The Sand Storm Lacrosse Festival at the Empire Polo Club
- Arbor Day Celebration
- Indio Tree Lighting Ceremony
- Dia de Los Muertos Celebration at the Coachella Valley History Museum
- Taste of Indio at Jackalope Ranch
- The California BBQ State Championship & Festival

=== Points of interest ===
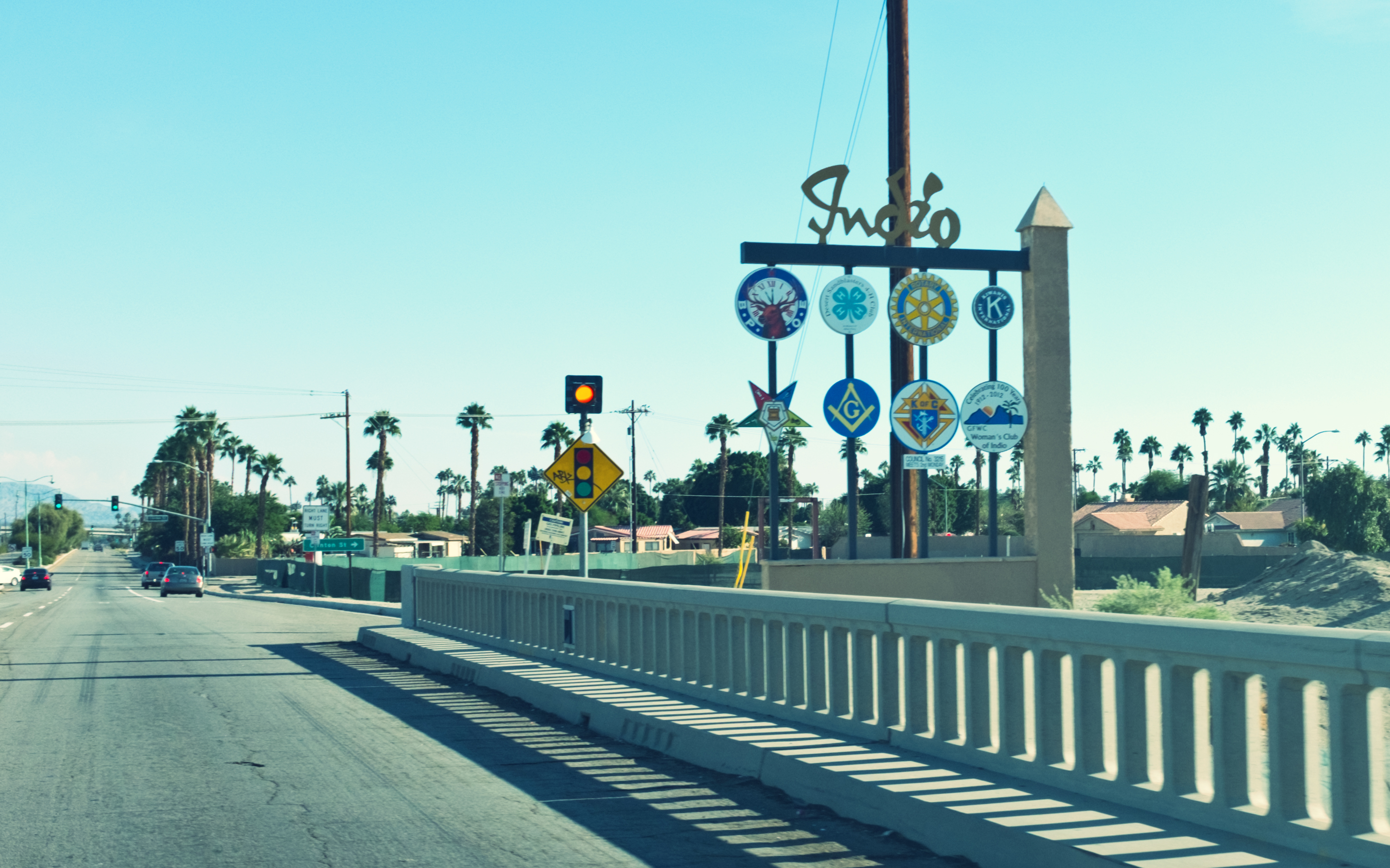
Welcome sign at Indio, California

The Coachella Valley History Museum Home, on Miles Avenue, has a two-acre campus, which currently includes the Smiley-Tyler House, built in 1926, the 1909 Schoolhouse, and the Date Museum dedicated to the history and development of the fruit (the only date museum in the world), plus gardens and archives preserving historical artifacts of the Coachella Valley. It also has the historic M.H. Whittier Ranch Tower, which is used for the only light art projection system in the Coachella Valley.

The Indio Performing Arts Center, known as IPAC, is located at the heart of downtown Indio at 45–175 Fargo Street to promote arts and entertainment for the community. IPAC has hosted live concerts, theater productions, dinner theater events and sing-alongs, movie nights, fashion shows, arts and crafts fairs, music video productions, and other special events. IPAC is a 23,000 sq. ft. facility with a main hall, the Expo Hall; three separate theaters that are approximately 2,200 sq. ft. each: Village Theatre, Cabaret Theatre, and the Old Towne Playhouse. Desert TheatreWorks occupies the facility, which has produced more than 50 plays and musicals, 8 children's musicals and more than 20 special events, making them one of the Coachella Valley's leading producers of theatre and educational programming for the performing arts. The College of the Desert also has a film class in the Village Theatre during the school year.

The Coachella Valley Art Center hosts workshops, and special events and includes a main gallery, project spaces, classrooms, a glass studio, performance space, and artist studios. The center has hosted local and international artists, and been a venue for art events and live performances.

From January to March each year, polo season is in full effect at the Eldorado Polo Club and the Empire Polo Club. Tailgating, food vendors, picnics, and polo games are a common sight at these family-friendly Sunday events.

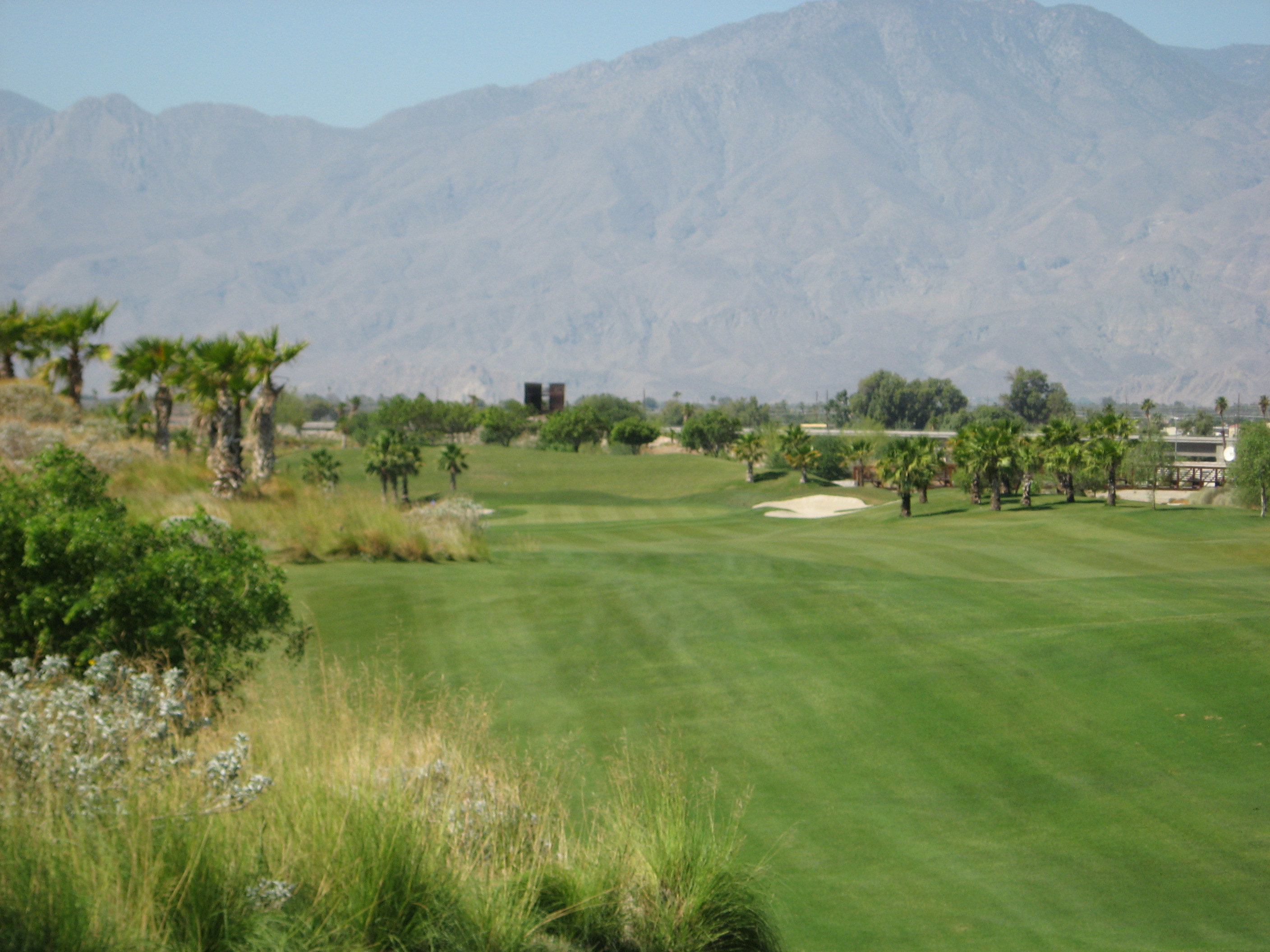
One of the many golf courses in Indio, California

Golfing is an attraction that brings people Indio and surrounding cities, with the Coachella Valley housing approximately 28 percent of all California's golf courses. Golf course development in the desert became a huge phenomenon in the 1950s, with a golf course opening approximately every 100 days. During the winter months, country clubs with golf courses attract dozens of vacationers each year. Today, there are more than 13 golf courses located in Indio and 124 golf courses in the entire Coachella Valley. The City of Indio, in particular, owns the only night-lighted golf course in the Coachella Valley – the Lights at Indio Golf Course.

Casinos are also a point of interest in Indio that draw a large crowd. Fantasy Springs Resort Casino is owned by the Cabazon Band of Mission Indians, whose tribal headquarters are also located in Indio. The casino opened in 2004 and includes a hotel, bowling center, golf course, and special events center that acts as a concert venue. The Fantasy Springs special events center has hosted musicians as big as The Beach Boys, John Legend, Snoop Dogg, Stevie Nicks, and Kelly Clarkson.

=== Old Town Historic Mural Program ===
In the fall of 1996, the Indio Chamber of Commerce formed a committee to develop a Historic Mural Project to help revitalize the local economy at the time of the statewide economic recession. It began with a suggestion to start a mural project first brought to the city by David Hernandez, a former Indio city council member, after he visited Chemainus. Very little happened with this concept until 1996, when the Riverside County National Date Festival's executive director Bruce Latta and commissioned artist Bill Weber of San Francisco to paint a mural of the Taj Mahal on the Taj Mahal (Garden of Allah) building at the fairgrounds. At the same time, local businessman Bruce Clark, who was instrumental in promoting Historic U.S. Route 99 (Indio Blvd.) to its former status as the Main Street of California. He maintains a website on Historic Route 99. He brought the mural idea forward again after seeing the success of a similar local program in 29 Palms. When Clark presented the idea to the chamber board of directors, the idea was immediately recognized as something that could help the city's economy by encouraging tourism. Indio now has ten murals about the city on the sides of various buildings in Old Town and on a water reservoir tank on Monroe Street.

== Government and politics ==
Indio vote by party in presidential elections
Year	Democratic	Republican	Third Parties
2024	53.35% 16,580	44.67% 13,883	1.97% 613
2020	60.00% 19,832	38.49% 12,721	1.51% 501
2016	59.14% 14,345	36.74% 8,911	4.12% 1,000
2012	58.26% 11,902	40.36% 8,245	1.38% 282
2008	58.16% 10,795	40.52% 7,521	1.32% 246
2004	51.39% 6,114	47.72% 5,678	0.89% 106
2000	60.11% 4,706	37.35% 2,924	2.54% 199
1996	54.98% 3,795	32.91% 2,272	12.11% 836
1992	48.53% 3,670	25.85% 1,955	25.62% 1,938

In the California State Legislature, Indio is in the 18th senatorial district, represented by Democrat Steve Padilla, and in the 36th Assembly district, represented by Republican Jeff Gonzalez.

In the United States House of Representatives, Indio is in California's 25th congressional district, represented by Democrat Raul Ruiz.

The city operates under a City Council-City Manager form of government with five elected members of the City Council served by a City Manager and staff and City Attorney. The five councilmembers are elected by district for four-year terms. Each year the Council selects the Mayor on a rotational basis and determines assignments for the external commissions and committees at its first meeting of December. The City Council is the legislative body for the city, Public Financing Authority and Redevelopment Agency. Its responsibilities include establishing City policies, adopting of ordinances and resolutions as well as the budget, holding public hearings, authorizing expenditures, and the appointment of the City Manager, City Attorney and the member of City commissions and committees.

Indio is the location of several of Riverside County's administrative centers. This includes the Larson Justice Center courthouse and the John J. Benoit Detention Center in downtown. The County's Workforce Development Center is located on Monroe Street.

== Education ==
Indio is served by two public school districts: Desert Sands Unified and on the city's southeastern corner, Coachella Valley Unified. Desert Sands' headquarters is located in La Quinta.

Indio's six elementary and two middle schools are highly rated under the California Distinguished Schools program. Because of Indio's growing population and above-average number of young people with families, the two school districts are expanding, with plans on building more schools, along with remodeling the older ones with new buildings and designs.

Schools in or near Indio:

Desert Sands Unified – primary school district for Indio

- Elementary (grades K–5): Carrillo Ranch, Dr. Reynaldo J. Carreon Jr. Academy, Amelia Earhart (International studies), John Adams (STEM school) near Benjamin Franklin in La Quinta, Richard Oliphant, Herbert Hoover, Andrew Jackson, Lyndon B. Johnson, John F. Kennedy, James Madison, James Monroe (in Bermuda Dunes), Theodore Roosevelt, Martin Van Buren, and Horizon Elementary (independent studies) in La Quinta
- Middle/junior high schools (grades 6–8): Colonel Mitchell Paige Middle School (in La Quinta), La Quinta Middle, Desert Ridge Academy; Thomas Jefferson; Indio Middle School (Charter); John Glenn Middle School of International Studies (California Distinguished School); and Horizon Middle (independent studies) in La Quinta
- High schools (grades 9–12): Indio High; La Quinta High in La Quinta; Shadow Hills; Amistad High, a continuation high school in former site of Woodrow Wilson Middle School; and Horizon High (independent studies) in La Quinta
- Adult school: Courses include: GED Test preparation, ESL Beg/Int/Adv classes, Citizenship classes, a RossettaStone Language lab, and more.
- Special studies: Eisenhower Community Education Center.

Coachella Valley Unified – school district for the southeastern portion of Indio, along with neighboring communities

- Elementary (grades K–6): Mountain Vista Elementary
- Middle/junior high schools (grades 7–8): Cahuilla Desert Academy
- High schools (grades 9–12): Coachella Valley High and Desert Mirage High School, both in Thermal

Private schools

Grace Academy (K–8), Indio Christian Center (1–12), River Springs Charter School (K–12), Our Lady of Perpetual Help (PK–8), Trinity Lutheran Child Development Center (PK, K) and Christian School of the Desert (PK–12), located in nearby Bermuda Dunes

Higher education

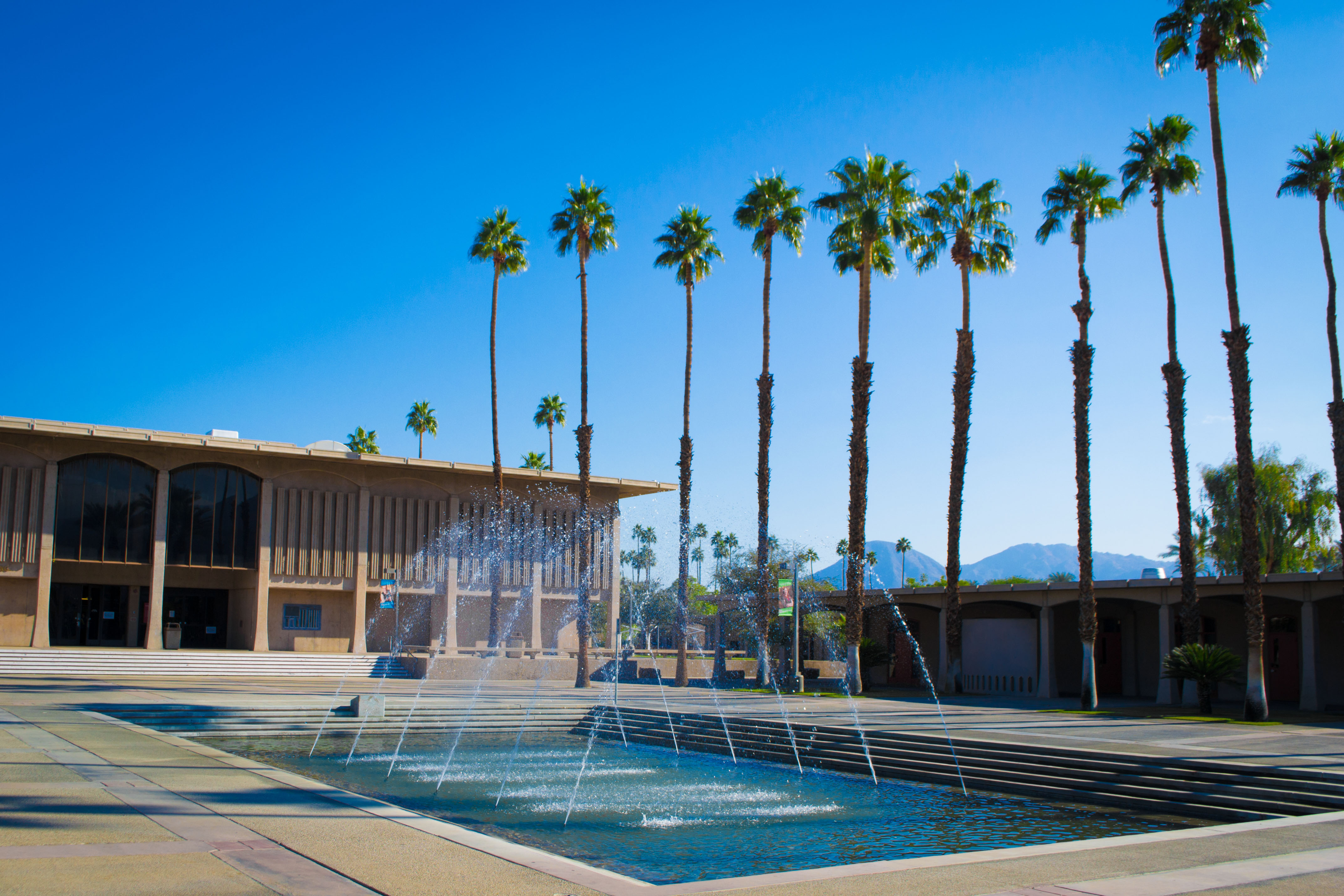
The "International Fountain of Knowledge" on the campus of College of the Desert in Palm Desert, California

The College of the Desert is a two-year community college serving the Coachella Valley since 1958. C.O.D opened a campus facility in 2002 in the Riverside County Employment Developmental Center located on Monroe Street. Several years later, the college's Indio Campus opened along Oasis Street in downtown Indio. C.O.D has increased its presence in the Eastern Coachella Valley by greatly expanding the Indio Campus in the 2020s, and adding an additional satellite campus in the agricultural belt of the area in Mecca.

Riverside County has a Regional Occupational Program facility in Indio that provides vocational educational courses in the Coachella Valley's job market.

The California Desert Trial Academy College of Law was approved by the California State Bar as an unaccredited fixed facility law school in Indio and is currently holding classes in the County Law Library in Indio. Meanwhile, plans are moving forward on the school constructing its own campus buildings in downtown Indio.

== Media ==
The Indio Date Palm was an early paper established in 1912 by John Winfield (J. Win) Wilson.

Print news in Indio is most notably provided by The Desert Sun, a daily newspaper part of the USA Today Network with a circulation of 14,685 in Indio in 2017. Providing news coverage of the Coachella Valley and distributing to eight cities, The Desert Sun had the largest newspaper circulation in the desert in 2017.

The Coachella Valley also receives news coverage from the Press-Enterprise, a Riverside-based daily newspaper, and Desert Star Weekly, a Riverside County adjudicated newspaper. There are many other independently or Self Published daily newspapers and weeklies covering Indio, such as the Coachella Valley Independent and Tidbits of the Coachella Valley.

Newspapers aimed at a Latino readership are also essential in Indio, due to the high number of Spanish-speaking Hispanics/Latinos in the area. El Informador del Valle is printed in Spanish then distributed to homes and a range of meat markets, gas stations, Hispanic restaurants, and more locally owned businesses throughout Indio. La Prensa Hispana is another such newspaper that is aimed toward Indio's Latino community, but uniquely merges English and Spanish together to provide a bilingual newspaper. The newspaper has received recognition from the Hispanic Chamber of commerce-Coachella Valley for its value and impact on the community.

There are also several online news sources that cover Indio, such as the Coachella Valley Weekly, Cactus Hugs, Coachella Magazine, KESQ, and Los Angeles Times. Entertainment and lifestyle magazines and publications include the Desert Entertainer, Coachella Magazine, and Desert Magazine, among others.

Indio has ten local television stations serving the Coachella Valley and six Spanish-language networks (local or regional affiliates like KUNA-LD and KVER-CD), some of which are over-air signals from Mexico. Eight Los Angeles television stations are available on cable and satellite service.

Four out of 20 Palm Springs area's radio stations are licensed to Indio: KESQ 1400 AM (in Spanish) owned by KESQ-TV/KDFX-CD, KKUU 92.7 FM (Urban/Hip-hop/R&B) owned by Morris Communications, KHCV 104.3, and classic rock KRHQ 102.3 FM owned by RM Broadcasting. However, none of the stations have their offices or studios in Indio. KHCV and KESQ are located in Palm Desert; both KKUU and KRHQ are located in Palm Springs.

== Public safety ==
Indio operates its own police department. In 2016, the Indio Police Department was one among 15 law enforcement agencies chosen to participate in President Barack Obama's 21st Century Policing Task Force. Recognized for its achievements in community engagement, the Indio Police Department was charged with implementing the Task Force's recommendations for policing in a year-long study. During Coachella Fest, Indio Police is able to handle a large number of 911 and non-emergency calls due to its six-position public safety answering point (PSAP).

In addition to the Indio Police Department, the city also contracts with the Riverside County Sheriff's Department for some law enforcement services. The Riverside County Coroner's branch office is located in Indio.

The city of Indio contracts for fire and paramedic services with the Riverside County Fire Department through a cooperative agreement with CAL FIRE. Indio has four fire stations in its city limits, and a full-time staff of 56 people.

The City of Indio also has a Fire Services Prevention Office, and, through the Riverside County, participates in the Volunteer Reserve Firefighter Program.

One of the eleven U.S. Customs and Border Protection stations is located in Indio. Created in 1936, the station was originally an auxiliary for the El Centro Sector station. Now, the border patrol agents stationed in Indio are tasked with patrolling the northern portion of Imperial County.

Indio is also the site of a California Highway Patrol Border Division office. The division patrols Interstate 10, State Routes 62, 86, and 177, which encompasses cities such as Desert Hot Springs, Palm Springs, Cathedral City, Rancho Mirage, Palm Desert, La Quinta, Indio, and Coachella.

== Infrastructure ==
=== Transportation ===
The nearest airport with regularly scheduled commercial passenger service is Palm Springs International Airport, about 20 miles (32 km) to the west. Nearby is Bermuda Dunes Airport (FAA designator: UDD) on the north-western border of Indio, along I-10 just west of Jefferson Street which has a 5,000-foot (1,500 m) runway and serves small private planes, air carriers and commuter jets. The Jacqueline Cochran Regional Airport in Thermal is just a few minutes from Indio, is named for the famous 1920s pilot and Indio resident and used for cargo planes to ship agricultural products, also on the four-lane California State Route 86 expressway or the "NAFTA highway" (in reference to the North American Free Trade Agreement) for international traffic.

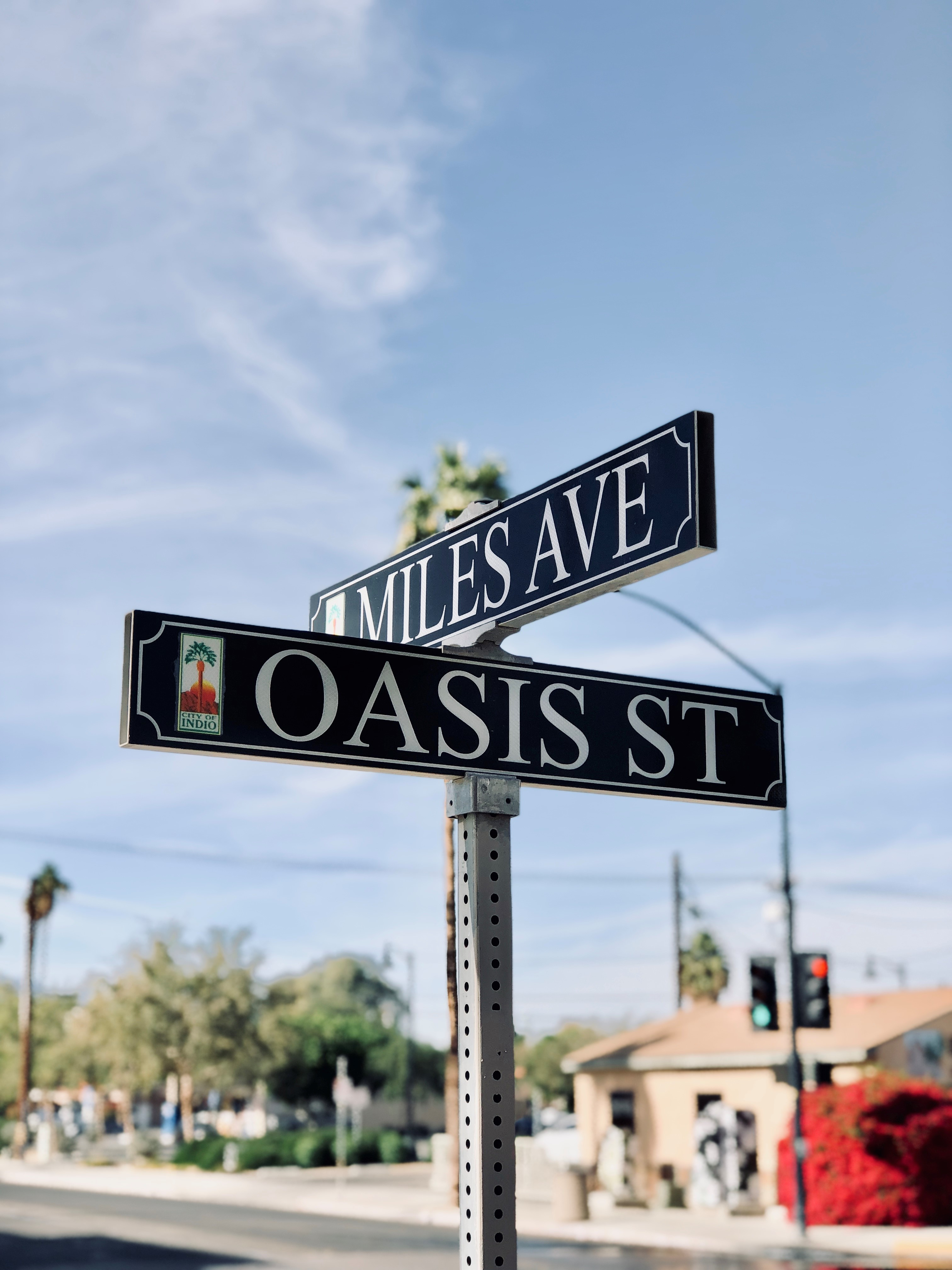
Intersection in downtown Indio at Miles Avenue and Oasis Street

Greyhound and Amtrak Thruway inter-city passenger buses stop at Indio station with regular services to stops in Southern California, Arizona, and the Mexican border. The city is served by the local bus line SunLine Transit Agency ("SunBus"), which services much of the Coachella Valley. The Amtrak rail station is expected to be reactivated in April 2021 for that year's Coachella Valley Music Festival. As of 2020 the city and the Riverside County Transportation Commission are planning a passenger rail service that will run to Los Angeles from Indio.

Interstate 10 is the primary highway in the city, running roughly on the north side. Highway 111 runs through the city which connects the northern end with I-10 in Whitewater to the southern end in Calexico.

=== Health care ===
The city has a major hospital providing general acute care, known as the John F. Kennedy Memorial Hospital. JFK Memorial Hospital provides a range of services, from 24/7 emergency care to surgical services. One of three hospitals in the Coachella Valley, JFK hospital expanded and opened a new maternity center as part of a 2002 hospital expansion plan for more surgical rooms, intensive care units and a new concrete emergency heliport. The Indio (renamed John F. Kennedy) hospital opened in a new location in 1983 on land donated by hospital co-founder Dr. Reynaldo J. Carreon.

In 2017, JFK Memorial Hospital, Desert Regional Medical Center, and Hi-Desert Medical Center, along with several affiliated outpatient clinics and centers, came together to form the Desert Care Network. According to Desert Care Network CEO Michelle Finney, the main purpose of the Desert Care Network is to "help improve care coordination between our hospitals and our affiliated entities for the more than 125,000 patients we treat every year."

Coachella Valley Volunteers in Medicine, a branch of Volunteers in Medicine, is the Coachella Valley's only no-cost clinic providing chronic, acute, preventive, and mental health care to adult residents. Located in Indio, the clinic had a total of 3,154 visits in 2018.

In addition, California Care Force, a non-profit organization that sets up temporary no-cost clinics across California, provides free medical, dental, and vision services for residents at the Riverside County Fairgrounds in Indio each year. In its seventh annual free clinic in 2019, California Care Force served 1,818 Coachella Valley uninsured and underinsured residents.

In 2018, Loma Linda University Children's Health – Indio opened its doors to serve approximately 150 children per week on a range of pediatric services such as general pediatric care, neurological care, and behavioral health counseling. The clinic's large scope of health care services and weekly number of patients is largely due to its 13,000-square-foot (1,200 m^{2}) size – making it the largest pediatric center in the Coachella Valley.

=== Parks and recreation ===
The city of Indio operates a variety of public parks, including a municipal golf course, a community recreation center, a senior center one block from the Indio teen center located across from Indio High school, and the Desert Park Wildlife Refuge north of 40th and 42nd Avenues.

- Burr Park – Located at 42811 Burr Street
- Cahuilla Park – formerly called Indio Terrace Park. Located at 83787 Hopi Avenue
- Davis Field – baseball/softball fields. Located at 83100 Date Street
- Dominguez Park – named after Al Dominguez, the city's first Mexican-American councilman in the 1950s/1960s. Located at 81967 Crown Way
- Doug York Plaza – a gazebo and benches. Located at 82985 Indio Boulevard
- Dr.Carreon Park – park-playground with water tower arts mural of local history. Located at 82200 Dr. Carreon Boulevard
- George S. Patton Park – park-playground with basketball and tennis courts. Located at 83700 Avenue 43
- Hjorth Park – Located at 81253 Avenue 48
- Indio Community Center – includes a gymnasium and the Indio Community Park, operated by the Desert Recreation District. Located at 45871 Clinton St
- Miles Avenue Park – Located near the Coachella Valley History Museum at 82540 Miles Avenue
- Mulligan Dog Park – Located at 45355 Van Buren Street
- North Jackson Park – play-playground with basketball courts, tennis courts, softball fields. Located at 43200 Towne Street
- Shields Park – Located at 80500 Avenue 46
- South Jackson Park – near a Pawley Pool facility, a soccer field, a little league baseball stadium (Davis Sports Complex) and a YMCA/Boys & Girls club. Located at 46480 Jackson Street
- South Jackson Soccer Park – Located at 83318 Date Street
- Station 87 Dog Park – Located at 42900 1/2 Golf Center Parkway
- The Lights at Indio Golf Course – Located at 83040 Avenue 42
- Yucca Park – Located at 43605 Yucca Street

== Notable people ==
- Al Adamson – writer, producer, director and actor
- Judith 'Judie' Brown – 1979 co-founder of American Life League
- Timothy Bradley Jr. – professional boxer
- Enrique Cardenas – soccer player
- Abi Carter – winner of American Idol season 22
- Jacqueline Cochran – notable female pilot
- Cameron Crowe – writer and director
- Debi Derryberry – cartoon voice actor
- Troy Downing – U.S. representative for Montana
- Jeremiah Estrada – San Diego Padres pitcher
- Merv Griffin – television personality, singer, actor, producer
- Stephan Jenkins – writer, lead vocalist for Third Eye Blind
- Anthony Kim – golfer
- Oscar Loya – singer and Broadway musical theatre performer
- Oscar Lua – USC college football player
- Vanessa Marcil – actress
- June Hill Robertson McCarroll – physician, invented painted lines on highways
- Alan O'Day – musician
- Jenna Ortega – actress
- Tony Reagins – general manager of Los Angeles Angels of Anaheim 2007–2011
- Raul Ruiz – U.S. representative
- Marco Sanchez – actor
- Bill Snyder – former football head coach of Kansas State University Wildcats; head coach at Indio High School in 1960s and 1970s
- Cub Swanson – UFC fighter
- Stan Van Gundy – president of basketball operations and head coach of NBA's Detroit Pistons, born in Indio
- Ed White – San Diego Chargers and Minnesota Vikings lineman; played for Indio High School; the school's football stadium was named for him.

== Sister cities ==
Indio had city-to-city economic exchange programs with San Luis Rio Colorado, Sonora, Mexico, in the Sister Cities International (SCI) program. There are similar inter-city exchange agreements with Lynwood, California; Farmington, Minnesota; and American Fork, Utah, in the US, and officials from the Vancouver 2010 Winter Olympic Games visited the 2010 National Date Festival to promote the Vancouver, British Columbia, Canada, area.
