= KRHQ =

Coordinates: 33.871°N 116.228°W

- Indio, California; United States
- Broadcast area: Palm Springs, California
- Frequency: 102.3 MHz
- Branding: Q102.3

Programming
- Format: Classic rock

Ownership
- Owner: Marker Broadcasting

History
- First air date: 1993 (as KLCX)
- Former call signs: KRCQ (1990–1993); KLCX (1993–1996); KJJZ (1996–2015)

Technical information
- Licensing authority: FCC
- Facility ID: 43132
- Class: A
- ERP: 2,600 watts
- HAAT: 101 meters (331 ft)

Links
- Public license information: Public file; LMS
- Webcast: Listen Live
- Website: q102classicrock.com

KRHQ is a 2,600 watt Class A commercial classic rock radio station licensed to Indio, California, with studios in Palm Springs and which serves the greater Coachella Valley on 102.3 FM. The transmitter site is on a peak of the Indio Hills.

The station (as KJJZ), one of the first smooth jazz stations in the country, aired in 1996. The frequency was allocated less than three years before to KLCX Palm Desert, the area's first classic rock station. Though KLCX began as one of the most ambitious broadcasting projects to come to the Coachella Valley in years, the station soon fell on hard times. Financial troubles forced the sale of KLCX, its license and equipment to RM Broadcasting, owners of KPLM Palm Springs and KAJR Indian Wells. The studio equipment was moved to KPLM's Palm Springs studios.

RM Broadcasting hired smooth jazz morning show hosts Jim "Fitz" Fitzgerald (1996–2015) and Jeff Michaels (1996–2015).

As of November 2006, both KJJZ and KPLM stream real-time audio via the internet.

On February 27, 2015, KJJZ flipped its format from smooth jazz to classic rock, branded as "Q102.3". On March 3, 2015, KJJZ changed their call letters to KRHQ.
