= Tac/Quila =

Restaurant in Palm Springs, California, U.S.

- Interactive map of Tac/Quila

Restaurant information
- Food type: Mexican
- Location: Palm Springs, California, United States
- Coordinates: 33.8288°N 116.5468°W
- Website: tacquila.com

Tac/Quila is a Mexican restaurant in Palm Springs, California.

== Description ==
The Mexican restaurant Tac/Quila operates on North Palm Canyon Drive in Palm Springs. The restaurant Clandestino is described as a sibling eatery.

== See also ==
- List of Mexican restaurants
