= Historic Tennis Club =

Neighborhood in Palm Springs, California, USA

- Neighborhood of Palm Springs, California
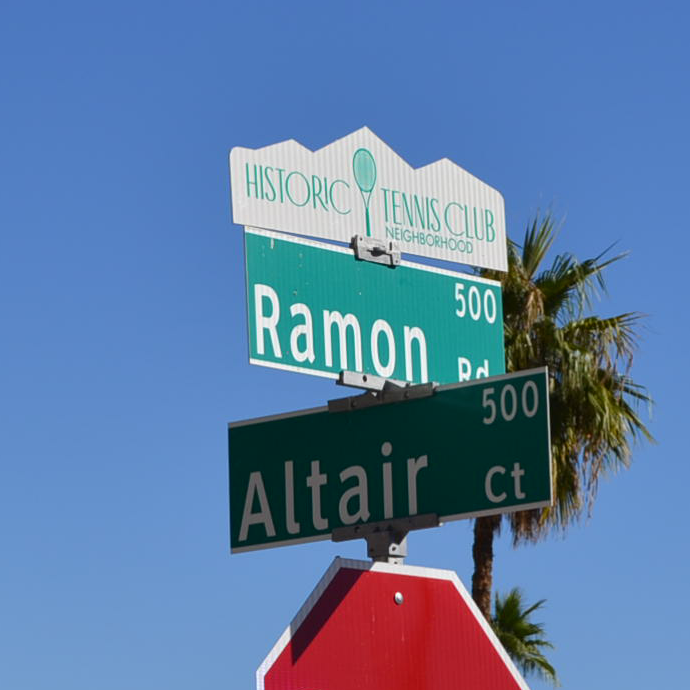
- Historic Tennis Club Blade sign
- Interactive map of Historic Tennis Club
- State: California
- County: Riverside County
- City: Palm Springs
- City Council Districts: 5

Government
  - Council Member: David Ready
  - State Assembly: Greg Wallis, Rep.
  - State Senate: Rosilicie Ochoa Bogh, Rep.
  - US Rep.: Ken Calvert, Rep.
  - US Senate: Alex Padilla, Dem. Adam B. Schiff, Dem.
- Neighborhood Organization: Historic Tennis Club Neighborhood Organization (HTCNO)

Historic Tennis Club (previously called The Tennis Club District) is one of the recognized neighborhoods in Palm Springs, California. Located west of downtown at the base of the San Jacinto Mountains, its boundaries are West Tahquitz Canyon Way to the north, South Belardo Road to the east, Tahquitz Creek to the south, and the San Jacinto Mountains to the west.

The area is one of the oldest neighborhoods in Palm Springs, named after the Palm Springs Tennis Club Resort, which opened in 1937, which attracted visitors associated with the film industry. Today, Historic Tennis Club contains multiple properties and sites designated as Class 1 Historic Sites by the City of Palm Springs.

Historic Tennis Club is one of the 52 legally recognized neighborhoods in Palm Springs by the City of Palm Springs Office of Neighborhoods and is part of the Organized Neighborhoods of Palm Springs (ONE-PS).

== History ==
In 1884, John Guthrie McCallum, one of the first settlers of Palm Springs, became the first non-indigenous person to reside in the Coachella Valley. McCallum came to the area with his family in hopes of curing his son’s tuberculosis. Guthrie built his adobe in what is now Historic Tennis Club. The McCallum adobe was relocated in the 1950s and is now operated as a museum by the Palm Springs Historical Society.

In 1923, McCallum’s daughter, Pearl McCallum McManus, began developing residential properties in the same neighborhood as her father. Among the early residents was artist Gordon Coutts, who built a Moorish-style villa called Dar Marroc (now part of the Korakia Pensione), and oilman Thomas O’Donnell, who constructed a Spanish Revival mansion (now the Thomas O'Donnell House) on the hillside overlooking the neighborhood.

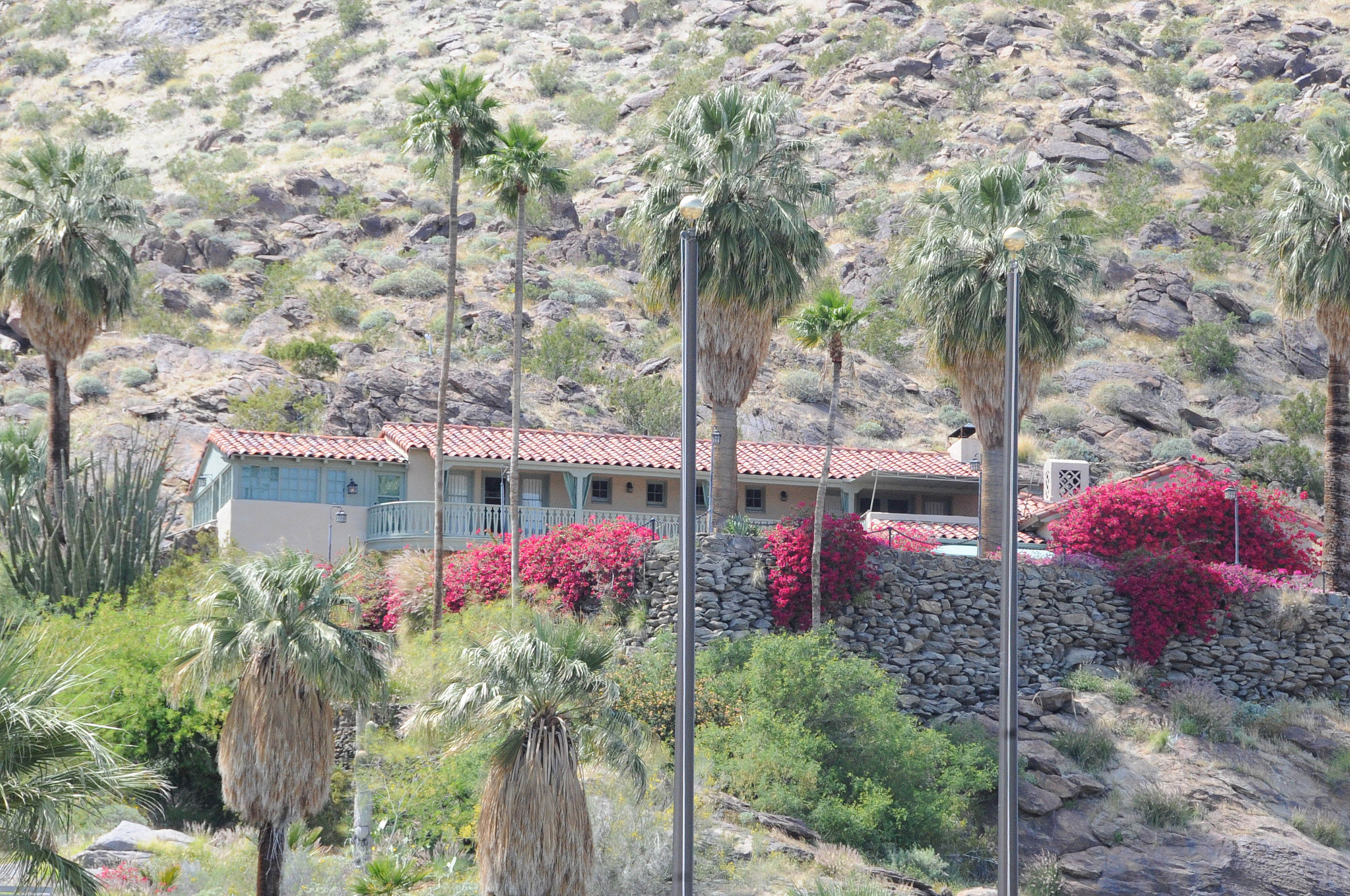
Thomas O'Donnell House

In 1937, McCallum McManus opened the private Palm Springs Tennis Club Resort, which became the neighborhood’s namesake. The Tennis Club was frequented by Hollywood visitors and tennis players, and later included architectural contributions by Paul R. Williams and A. Quincy Jones.

Harriet and Harold Cody established Casa Cody in the early 1920s, which remains the oldest operating hotel in Palm Springs. Harriet Cody (whose husband Harold was a cousin of William F "Buffalo Bill" Cody) developed the property into a group of adobe guest cottages.

During the 1940s and 1950s, the neighborhood expanded with resort and residential development. Hotels such as the Del Marcos Hotel (1947), designed by William F. Cody, and the Orbit In (1955), designed by Herbert W. Burns, reflected the emerging mid-century modern style.

The Historic Tennis Club Neighborhood Organization (HTCNO) is the legal entity that represents the neighborhood as part of ONE-PS.

=== Palm Springs Women’s Club ===
The Palm Springs Woman’s Club, located within the Historic Tennis Club neighborhood at 314 South Cahuilla Road, has been active in civic affairs in Palm Springs since its establishment. Its pink stucco clubhouse was completed in 1939 on land donated by McCallum McManus and designed by architect John Porter Clark in a simplified Moderne style. The club served as one of the few venues for public meetings and social gatherings in early Palm Springs and hosted a wide range of community activities, including drives during World War II and fundraising events for local schools and hospitals.

== Architecture ==
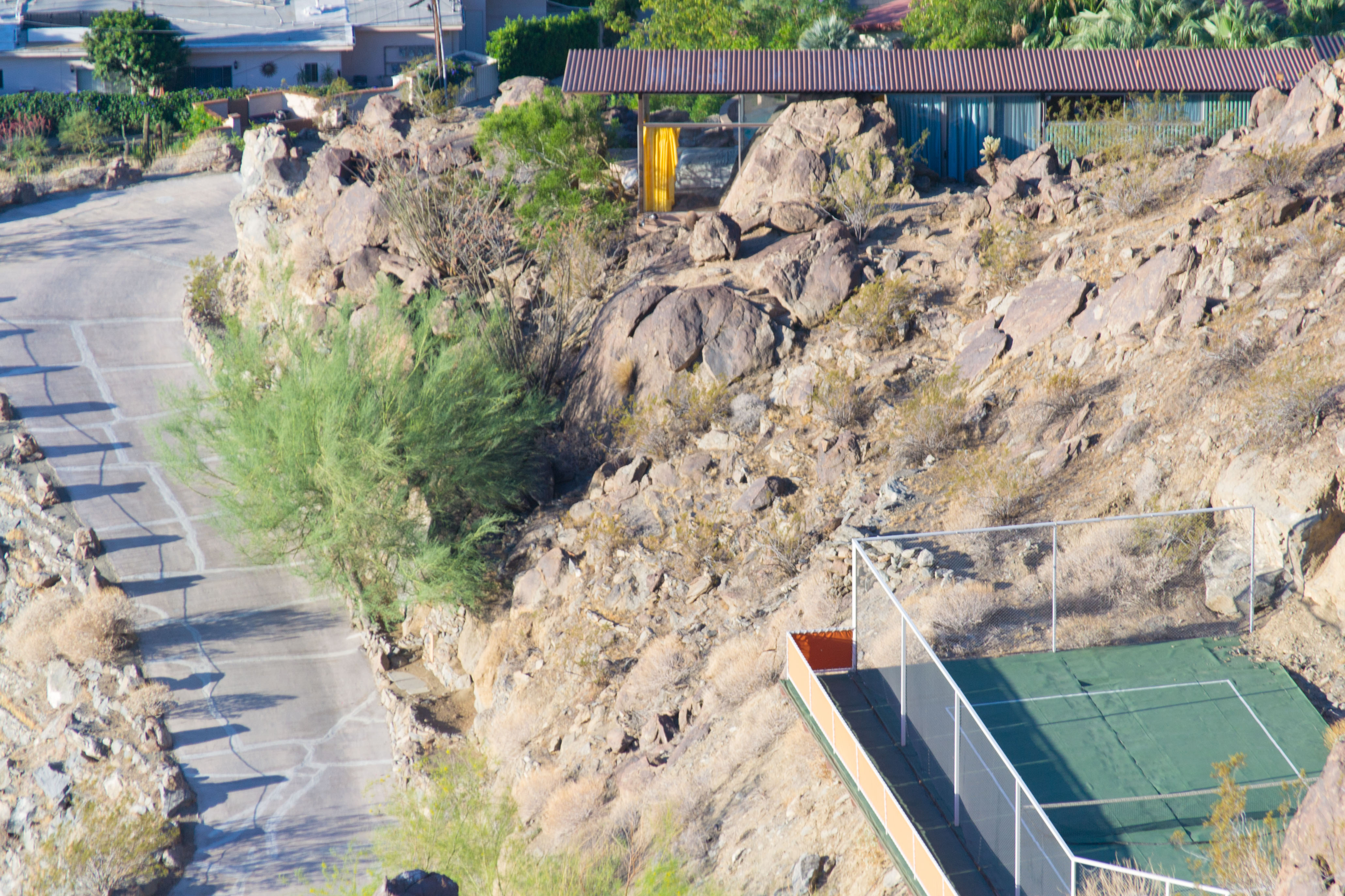
Albert Frey House (Palm Springs, California)

The neighborhood contains examples of Spanish Colonial Revival, Mediterranean, and mid-century modern architecture. Early 20th-century homes featured stucco walls, tile roofs, and interior courtyards. Later development introduced flat roofs, open plans, and use of glass and stone common in Desert Modernist design.

Representative works include the Roland Bishop Residence (1925), Frey House II (1964), and Town & Desert Apartments (1947).

== Historic properties ==
Fifteen properties located in the neighborhood have been designated Class 1 Historic Sites by the City of Palm Springs. Notable sites include:

- The Avery Field Cabin Ruins are the remains of a stone cabin built circa 1920 by photographer Avery Edwin Field at the western end of West Santa Rosa Drive. It was constructed as a residence and photography studio for Field’s expeditions in the early 1920s. The site is an example of early Palm Springs-era construction that remains partially intact, and is connected to a group of early 20th-century artists and writers known as the ‘Creative Brotherhood’ including Carl Eytel, J. Smeaton Chase, and Edmund C. Jaeger. In June 2019, the Palm Springs City Council designated the Field Cabin Ruins a Class 1 historic site, making it the city’s only designated historic ruins.
- Casa Cody is a historic hotel founded by Harriet Cody in 1937. It is the oldest continuously operating hotel in Palm Springs. The property’s early structures were built in an adobe hacienda style, reflecting early adobe and ranch-style construction, predating the city’s later mid-century modern architecture. Its oldest building, an adobe house constructed in 1910, once served as the winter residence of Metropolitan Opera baritone Lawrence Tibbett, who reportedly stored his piano in a cellar to protect it from the desert heat and entertained friends such as Charlie Chaplin. Casa Cody was designated a Class 1 Historic Site by the City of Palm Springs in 2008.
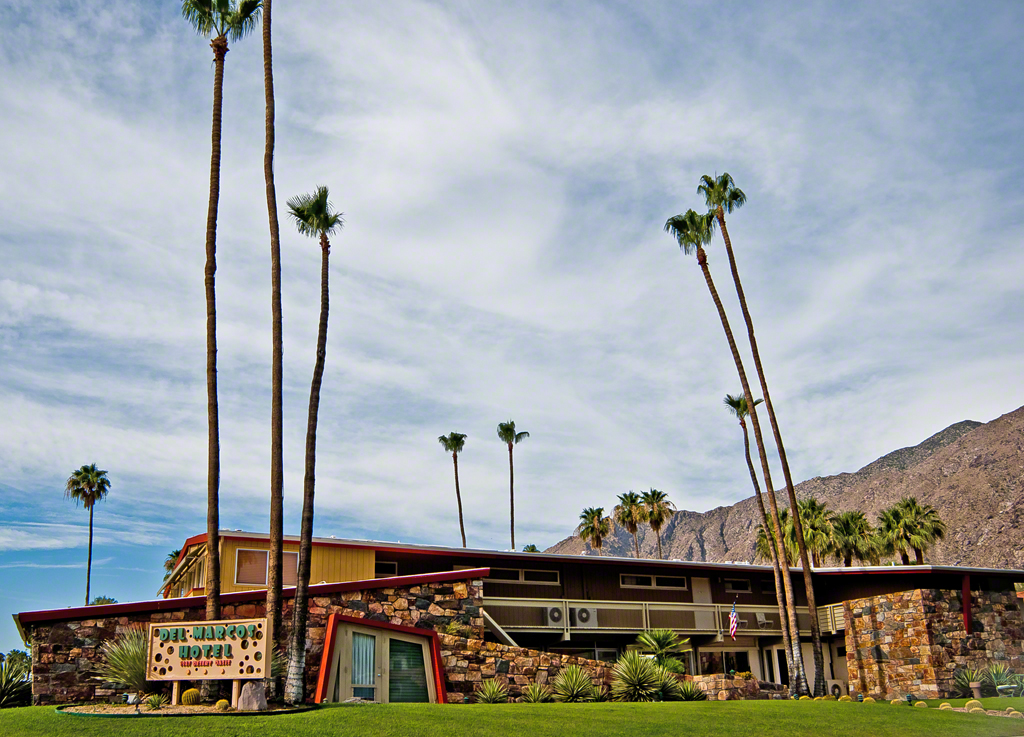
- Del Marcos Hotel
  The Del Marcos Hotel is a historic mid-century modern hotel, designed by architect William F. Cody, completed in 1947. It was Cody's first independent commission and is considered an early example of Desert Modernism by architectural historians. Constructed of redwood and stone, the hotel's design earned Cody the American Institute of Architects' "Award of the Year" for resort design, and was featured in Architectural Forum magazine. In 2012, it was designated a Class 1 Historic Site by the City of Palm Springs.
- Town & Desert Apartments (currently called The Hideaway), is a historic mid-century modern apartment complex designed by Herbert W. Burns, completed in 1947. Originally conceived as a resort apartment hotel, the complex gained national attention when it was featured in a May 1948 Architectural Record article titled “California Hide-Away, Motel Style.” The single-story complex exemplifies Desert Modernism with its low horizontal silhouette, deep overhanging eaves, expansive glass walls, and incorporation of materials such as sandstone and concrete block in its design. In July 2014, the property was designated a Class 1 Historic Site by the Palm Springs City Council.
- The Willows (also referred to as the William Mead Residence) is a historic boutique hotel in Palm Springs, California, originally built in 1924 as a private winter residence for Los Angeles developer William Mead and his wife, Nella. It was designed by architect William J. Dodd in a Mediterranean Revival (Italianate) style and features terraced gardens overlooking the Coachella Valley. The Willows was used as a seasonal residence by individuals including Albert Einstein who stayed there in 1932. The property was designated a Class 1 Historic Site by the City of Palm Springs in 1998.

=== Additional Class 1 Historic Sites, Historic Tennis Club ===
Additionally, ten other properties and sites have been designated Class 1 Historic Sites by the City of Palm Springs:

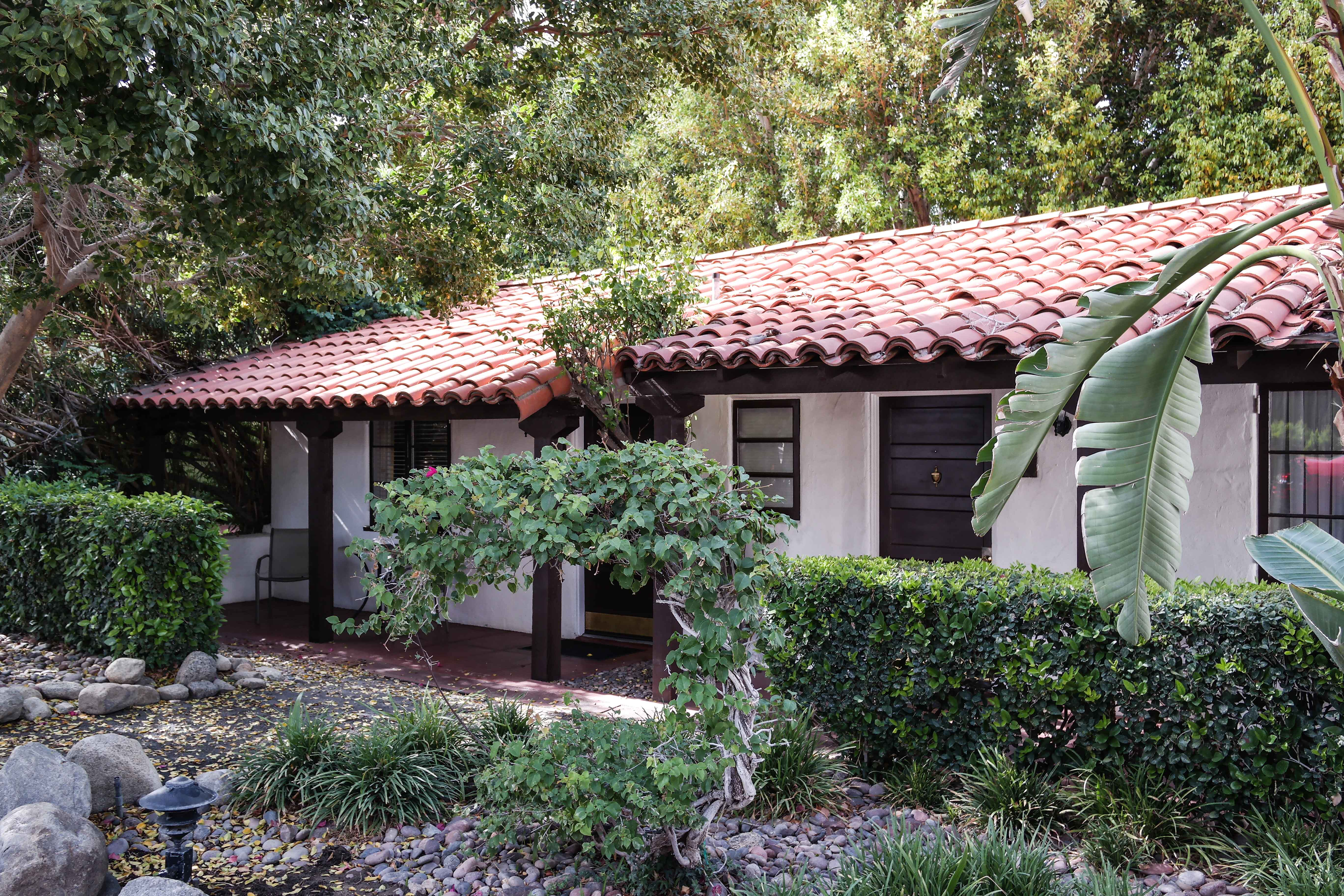
Ingleside Inn

The Carrie Birge Residence (aka Ingleside Inn)	200 West Ramon Road
The Community Church	284 South Cahuilla Road
The Crockett Residence	590 West Linda Vista Drive
The George Roberson Residence	385 West Tahquitz Canyon Way
Inspiration Point (aka The Promontory)	West end Chino Road
La Serena Villas Hotel	339 South Belardo Road
The Orchid Tree Inn	261 South Belardo Road
Roland Bishop Residence	468 West Tahquitz Canyon Way
Village Manor Hotel	562 West Arenas Road
The Welwood Murray Cemetery	Chino Drive (West End)

== Notable residents and guests ==
Notable residents and guests have included Pearl McCallum McManus, Harriet Cody, architect Albert Frey, whose Frey House II is located within the neighborhood, actors Gloria Swanson and Tom Mix, film producer Allan Carr and Albert Einstein.

== See also ==
- Palm Springs Preservation Foundation
- Palm Springs Historic Site Preservation Board
