= Palm Springs School of Architecture =

Style of architecture originating in Palm Springs, California, United States

The Palm Springs School of Architecture, is a regional style of post-war architecture that emerged in Palm Springs, California, and is closely associated with Desert Modernism. Many of the architects who pioneered this style became world-renowned later in their own careers. Numerous buildings and homes by these architects remain in the Coachella Valley. Additionally, this style of architecture is showcased annually at the Modernism Week event in Palm Springs.

== Characteristics ==
The Palm Springs School of Architecture is characterized by its adaptation to the desert's brutal climate. Block walls, clerestory windows, long, low rooflines, and the inclusion of the desert itself in the design highlight the common elements of the Palm Springs School. Architectural movements are often recognized only after the fact. While the spectrum of Palm Springs' midcentury architecture stretches all the way from John Lautner to Richard Neutra, the many architects working in this small town responded to a unique combination of conditions through a shared commitment to Modernism. This environment fostered creative and experimental approaches, allowing architects to take advantage of California’s design freedoms.

Each architect responded to the desert climate, mountain landscape, recreational culture, affluent clientele, and Modernist techniques, including mass production and steel-and-concrete construction. Their responses were different, but their devotion to modern ideas in the open atmosphere of Palm Springs and California nurtured a remarkable concentration of ideas and buildings. Though connected to the broader wave of innovative design in midcentury California, Palm Springs' relative isolation, focused architectural themes, and high concentration of architects working almost exclusively in the region led to a distinct architectural identity now known as the Palm Springs School.

== Notable architects ==
Robson Chambers, John Porter Clark, William F. Cody, Albert Frey, A. Quincy Jones, Hugh M. Kaptur, William Krisel, John Lautner, Richard Neutra, Donald Wexler, E. Stewart Williams, and Paul Revere Williams are the leading names of this regional style.

Other architects contributing to the Palm Springs School of Architecture include Barry Berkus, Herbert Burns, Charles Du Bois, Edward Fickett, Richard A Harrison, Howard Lapham, Harold Levitt, James McNaughton, Val Powelson, Robert Ricciardi, Stan Sackly, and Laszlo Sandor.

Architect and historian Alan Hess is a leading advocate of the Palm Springs School of Architecture.
