= Palm Springs Preservation Foundation =

Non-profit organization

- Palm Springs Preservation Foundation Logo
- Formation: 1997
- Type: Nonprofit
- Legal status: 501(c)(3)
- Headquarters: Palm Springs, California
- Region served: Palm Springs and Coachella Valley, California
- President: Gary Johns
- Website: Official Website

Palm Springs Preservation Foundation (PSPF) is a nonprofit organization based in Palm Springs, California, focused on the preservation of the region's historic architecture and cultural resources. The foundation advocates for the preservation of mid-century modern architecture in Palm Springs and the broader Coachella Valley.

== History ==
The organization was established in 1997 under the name Palm Springs Historic Site Foundation by Carl Prout, Diana "Moussie" Powell and others. It later adopted the name Palm Springs Preservation Foundation as its activities expanded to include educational programming and publications.

In 2023, the foundation received a Governor's Historic Preservation Award from the State of California for its advocacy, educational programming, and publications related to historic preservation in Palm Springs.

== Programs ==
=== Advocacy and preservation ===
PSPF has been involved in efforts to secure recognition and protection for historic buildings and neighborhoods in Palm Springs. The foundation has sponsored or supported several nominations before the city's Historic Site Preservation Board and City Council.

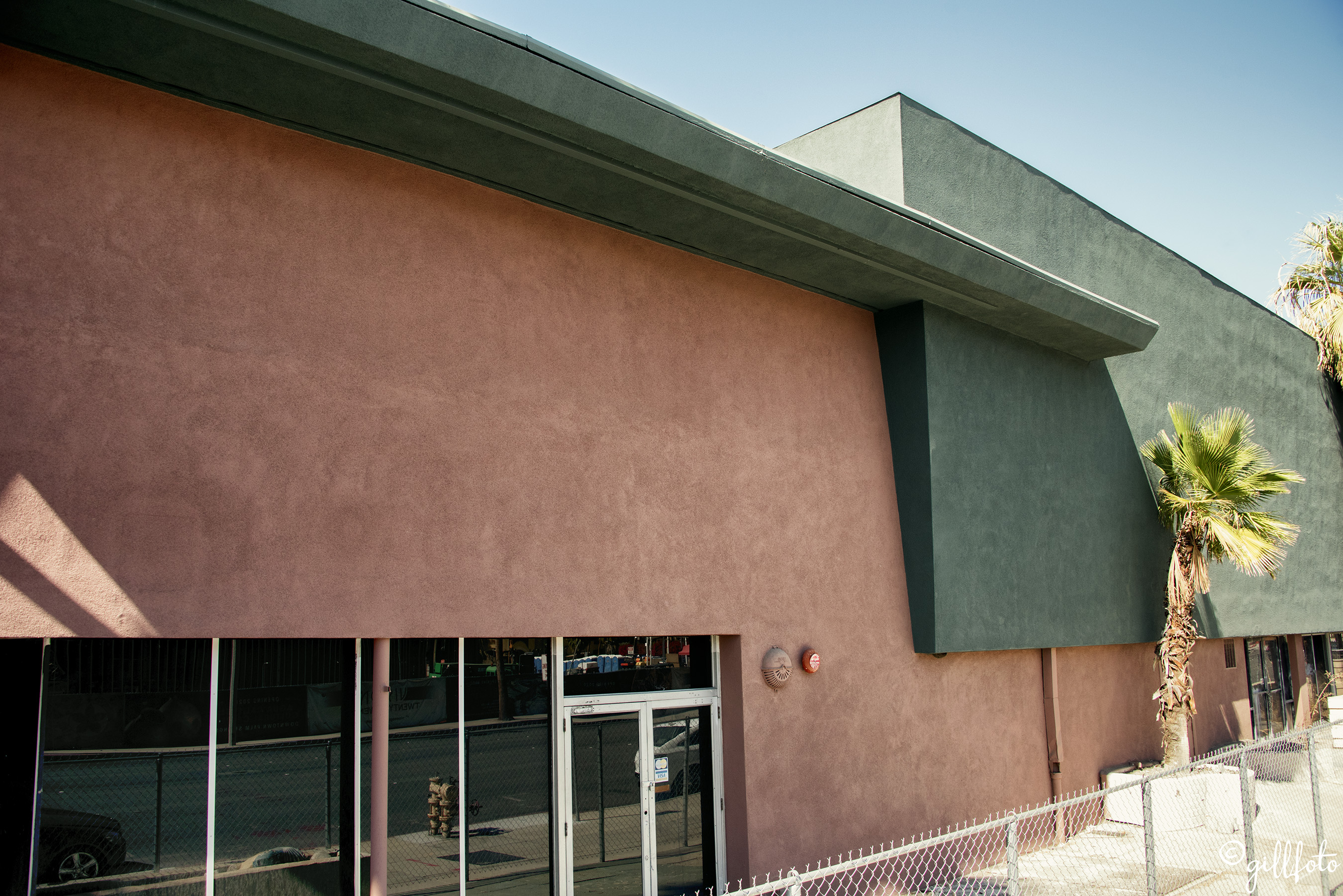
Town and Country Center office building

Among the sites associated with its advocacy are the Town & Country Center, a 1948 complex designed by Paul R. Williams and A. Quincy Jones, and Tahquitz Plaza, an office complex designed by Hugh M. Kaptur that was designated a Class 1 Historic Site in 2015. The foundation has also supported the designation of residential historic districts, including the Villa Roma condominium complex, which was recognized as a Class 1 Historic District in 2023.

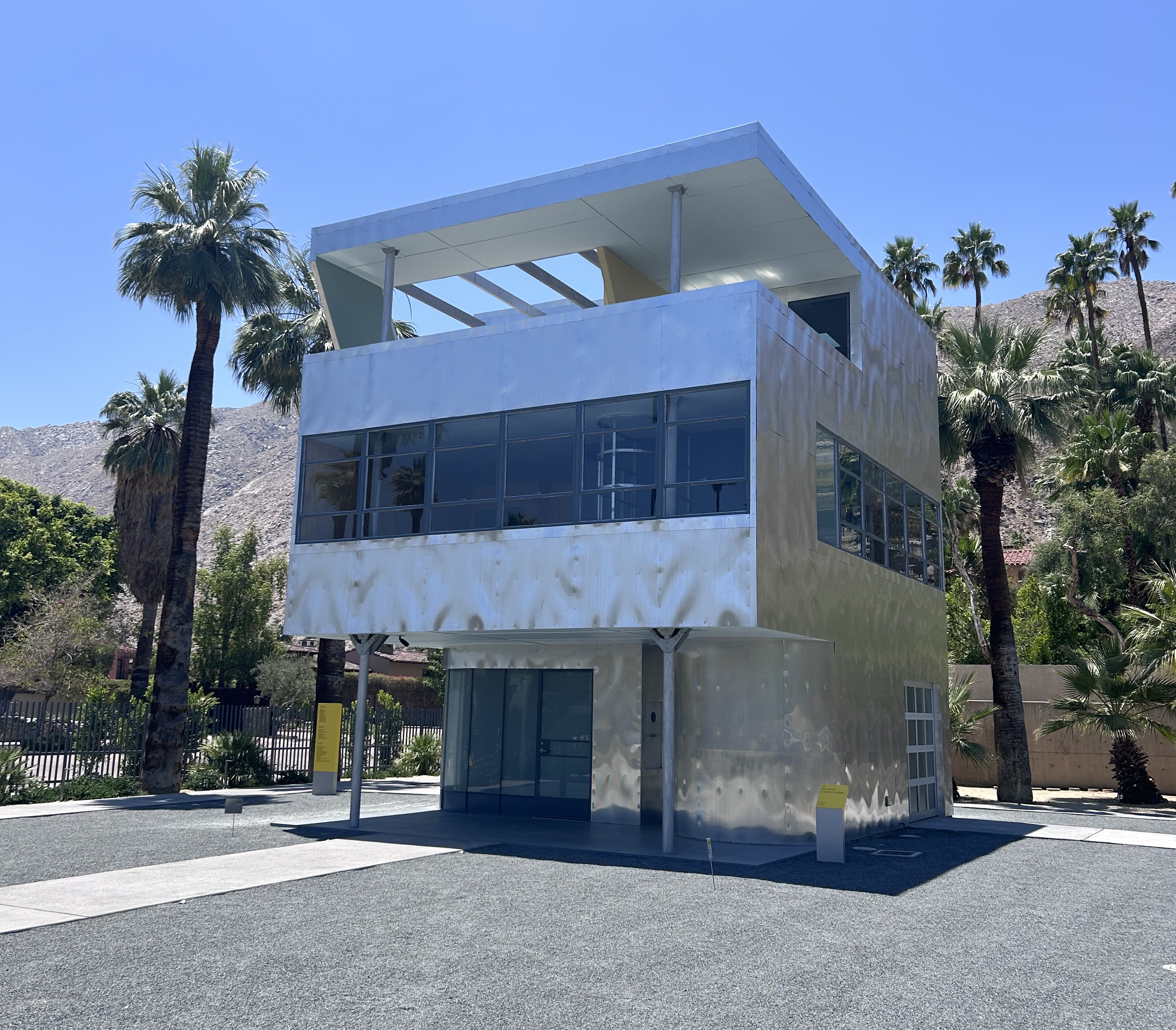
Aluminaire House

The foundation has been associated with preservation efforts involving several other local sites. These include the Aluminaire House, a 1931 prefabricated residence by Albert Frey and Lawrence Kocher that was relocated to the Palm Springs Art Museum in 2024; the Canyon Country Club Colony, a residential development noted for its architectural character; and the Palm Springs Financial District, where historic designation was extended to postwar commercial buildings. PSPF has also featured the demolished Maslon House, designed by Richard Neutra in 1962, in its public programming and educational materials.

=== Education and outreach ===
PSPF organizes lectures, tours, and other programs on architectural history and preservation. The foundation has produced public service videos and has partnered with local museums on exhibitions. Modernism Week, an independent nonprofit festival devoted to mid-century design and architecture, was co-founded with the involvement of PSPF, which continues to contribute programming. During Modernism Week, PSPF has presented free talks and guided home tours, including the recurring program Lost, Saved and Endangered: Modernist Architecture in Palm Springs. Local media have noted PSPF's role in Modernism Week, describing its programs as part of the festival's growth and visibility.

=== Publications ===
The foundation operates a publishing program that produces books and journals on Palm Springs architecture and design. Its publications have included architects such as William F. Cody, E. Stewart Williams, Herbert W. Burns, Hugh M. Kaptur, as well as developers including the Alexander Construction Company. The program has also published works on broader themes, including Spanish Colonial Revival and Polynesian-inspired architecture. PSPF's publishing program has been recognized by preservation and design organizations including awards from the Independent Publisher Book Awards.

== Local preservation organizations ==
Palm Springs has several other organizations involved in historic preservation. The city's Historic Site Preservation Board, created in 1981, reviews and recommends site and district designations. The Palm Springs Modern Committee, founded in 1999, is a nonprofit focused on Desert Modern architecture. The Palm Springs Historical Society, established in 1955, operates museums and maintains archives on the city's broader history. The Palm Springs Architectural Alliance, created in 2018, focuses on the preservation of the region's architectural heritage.
