= Palm Springs Architectural Alliance =

Nonprofit organization in Palm Springs, California

- Palm Springs Architectural Alliance logo
- Formation: 2018
- Founder: Dick Burkett, Richard and Debra Hovel, and Sidney Williams
- Type: Nonprofit organization
- Legal status: 501(c)(3)
- Purpose: Preservation of architectural heritage in Palm Springs and the Coachella Valley
- Headquarters: Palm Springs, California
- Region served: Coachella Valley
- Parent organization: Palm Springs Center for Creativity
- Website: Official Website

The Palm Springs Architectural Alliance (PSAA) is a nonprofit organization based in Palm Springs, California, that focuses on preserving the region's architectural heritage. Formed in 2018 by local preservationists and architects, the Alliance brings together several existing organizations and individuals active in architecture and historic preservation. Its founders – Dick Burkett, Richard and Debra Hovel, and Sidney Williams – envisioned a coalition that could coordinate efforts to protect Palm Springs’ architectural legacy and guide the future of the city's built environment.

== History and mission ==
The Palm Springs Architectural Alliance was formed in 2018 in response to concerns about the need for greater collaboration among the city's architectural and preservation organizations. Burkett (then chair of the Palm Springs Historic Site Preservation Board and a board member of the Palm Springs Modern Committee) convened an informal working group of stakeholders. Inspired by other regional architecture “schools,” the founders aimed to foster a similar approach for Palm Springs’ modernist traditions and to ensure its continued relevance in contemporary design.

PSAA's aim is to help preserve Palm Springs’ architectural legacy while developing design principles and guidelines for the city's future built environment. The Alliance advocates for maintaining the city's mid-20th-century modernist landmarks and has also spoken out regarding design standards for new development so that contemporary buildings complement the historic architectural character.

== Programs and initiatives ==
=== Architectural education ===
One of the Alliance's initiatives was facilitating a partnership between the College of the Desert and California State Polytechnic University, Pomona, to establish an architecture degree program in Palm Springs. A proposed 27-acre campus design unveiled in 2020 drew upon desert modernist traditions.

=== Modernism Week ===
PSAA organizes conferences and forums as part of Modernism Week. In 2020 it launched “Fast Forward: Designing the Future of Palm Springs,” a virtual symposium focused on design guidelines for new development.

A follow-up event in 2021 expanded the focus to housing and sustainability, including the first Modernism Week session devoted to affordable housing design.

In 2023, the Palm Springs Art Museum, in partnership with PSAA, presented a symposium on the work of architect Albert Frey.

=== Palm Springs School of Architecture ===
PSAA supported research into the Palm Springs School of Architecture. This resulted in the 2025 book The Palm Springs School: Desert Modernism 1934–1975 by Alan Hess, published with PSAA support. A symposium at the Palm Springs Art Museum in February 2025 featured Hess and other scholars discussing the region's legacy.

== Advocacy and impact ==
PSAA members have commented on planning and development proposals. In 2025, Alliance representatives criticized a residential project as “pseudo-modern” and inconsistent with Palm Springs’ design traditions.

== Distinction from other organizations ==
The Palm Springs Architectural Alliance is distinct from other local preservation groups. PSAA functions as a collaborative forum that combines preservation goals with advocacy for contemporary design.

To achieve this goal, PSAA works in partnership with organizations, including:

- American Institute of Architects California
- Coachella Valley Preservationists
- Modernism Week
- Palm Springs Art Museum
- Palm Springs Historic Site Preservation Board
- Palm Springs Modern Committee
- Palm Springs Preservation Foundation
- Preservation Mirage
- Sunnylands Center and Gardens
- USModernist
