= Palm Springs Modern Committee =

- PS Modern Committee logo
- Formation: 1999
- Type: Nonprofit organization
- Legal status: 501(c)(3)
- Purpose: Preservation of mid-century modern architecture and design
- Headquarters: Palm Springs, California
- Region served: Coachella Valley
- Website: Official Website

The Palm Springs Modern Committee (abbreviated as PS ModCom) is a nonprofit organization based in Palm Springs, California. Founded in 1999, it works to preserve and increase public awareness of mid-century modern architecture and design in the Coachella Valley. The committee is one of several preservation-focused organizations in Palm Springs, alongside the Palm Springs Preservation Foundation, the Palm Springs Historical Society, the Palm Springs Architectural Alliance, and the city's Historic Site Preservation Board.

== History ==
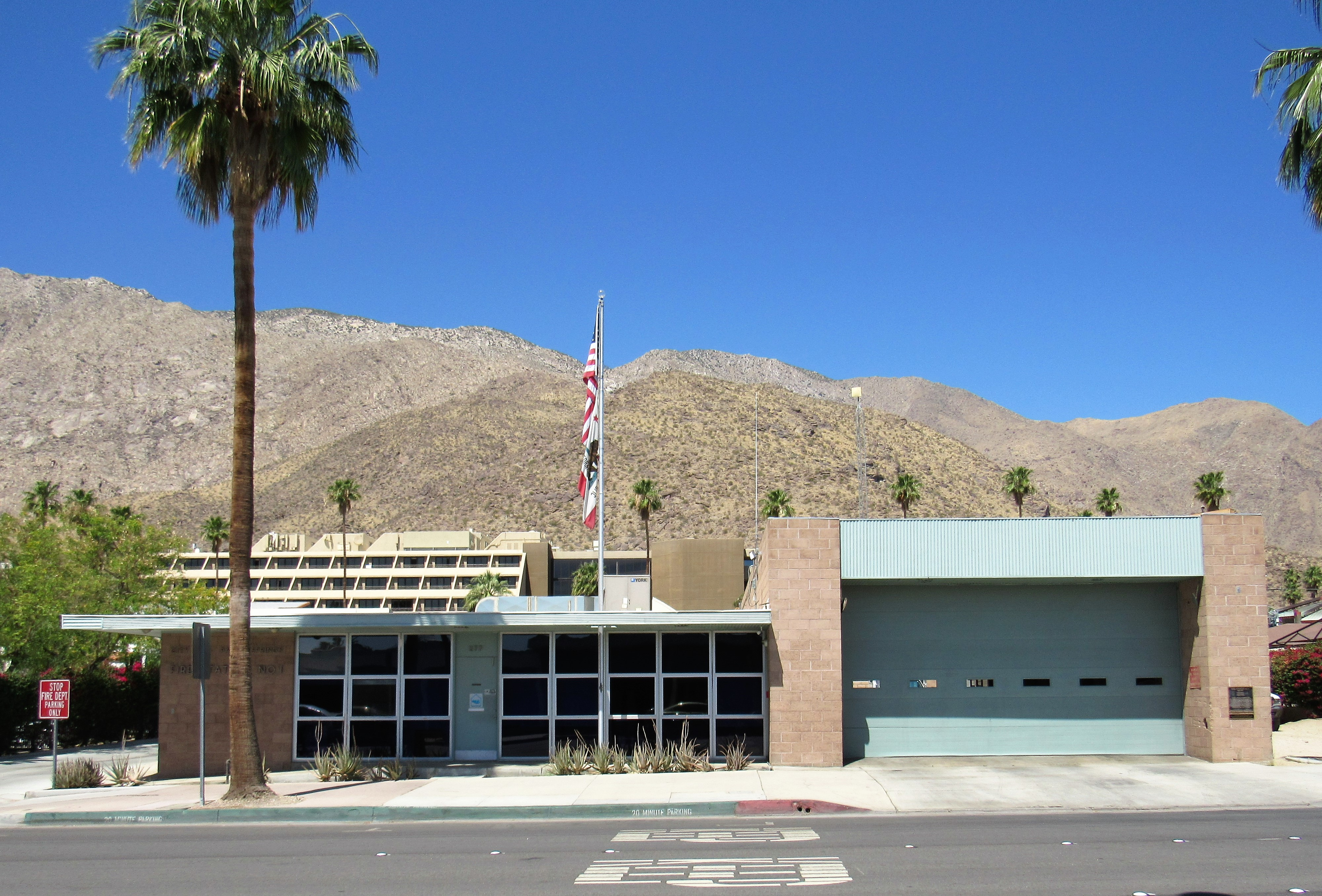
Fire Station No. 1 – Palm Springs, California

The Palm Springs Modern Committee was founded in 1999 by local preservationists responding to the proposed demolition of Fire Station No. 1. The City had proposed demolishing the building, designed by Albert Frey and Robson Chambers, to build a parking garage on the site. Thanks to the efforts of the committee and others, the Fire Station was saved from demolition and designated a Historic Site by the Palm Springs City Council in June 2000. The formation of the committee coincided with a wider revival of interest in mid-century modern architecture and growing recognition of Palm Springs’ role in the Desert Modernism movement.

In its early years, PS ModCom supported nominations of buildings for Class 1 Historic Resource designation through the city’s Historic Site Preservation Board, including designs by architects such as Frey, E. Stewart Williams, and Donald Wexler.

== Programs and activities ==
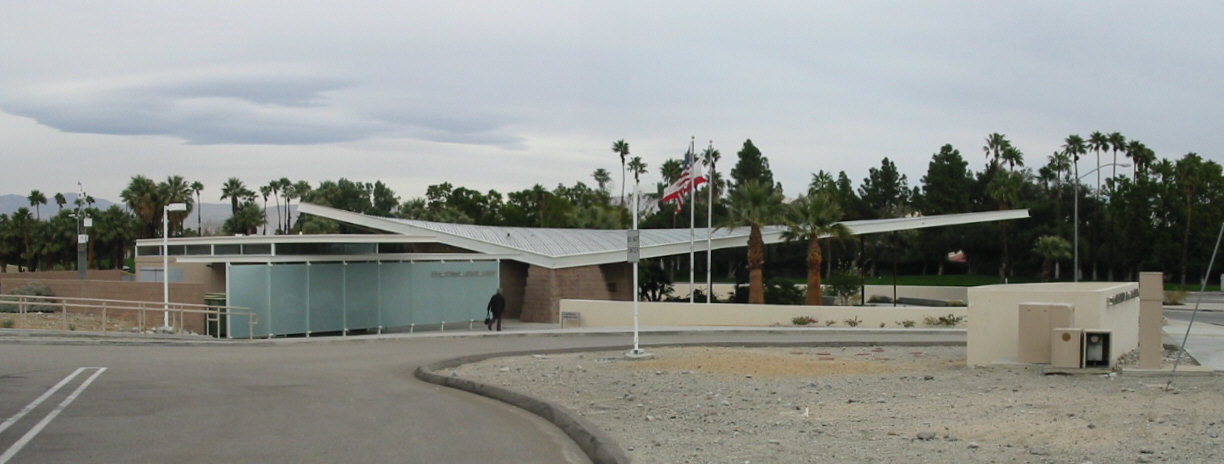
Tramway Gas Station

PS ModCom conducts advocacy, education, and recognition initiatives related to architectural preservation.

- Advocacy for preservation – The committee has participated in efforts to protect landmarks such as the 1965 Tramway Gas Station, designed by Frey and Robson Chambers, which was threatened with demolition before being repurposed as the Palm Springs Visitor Center.
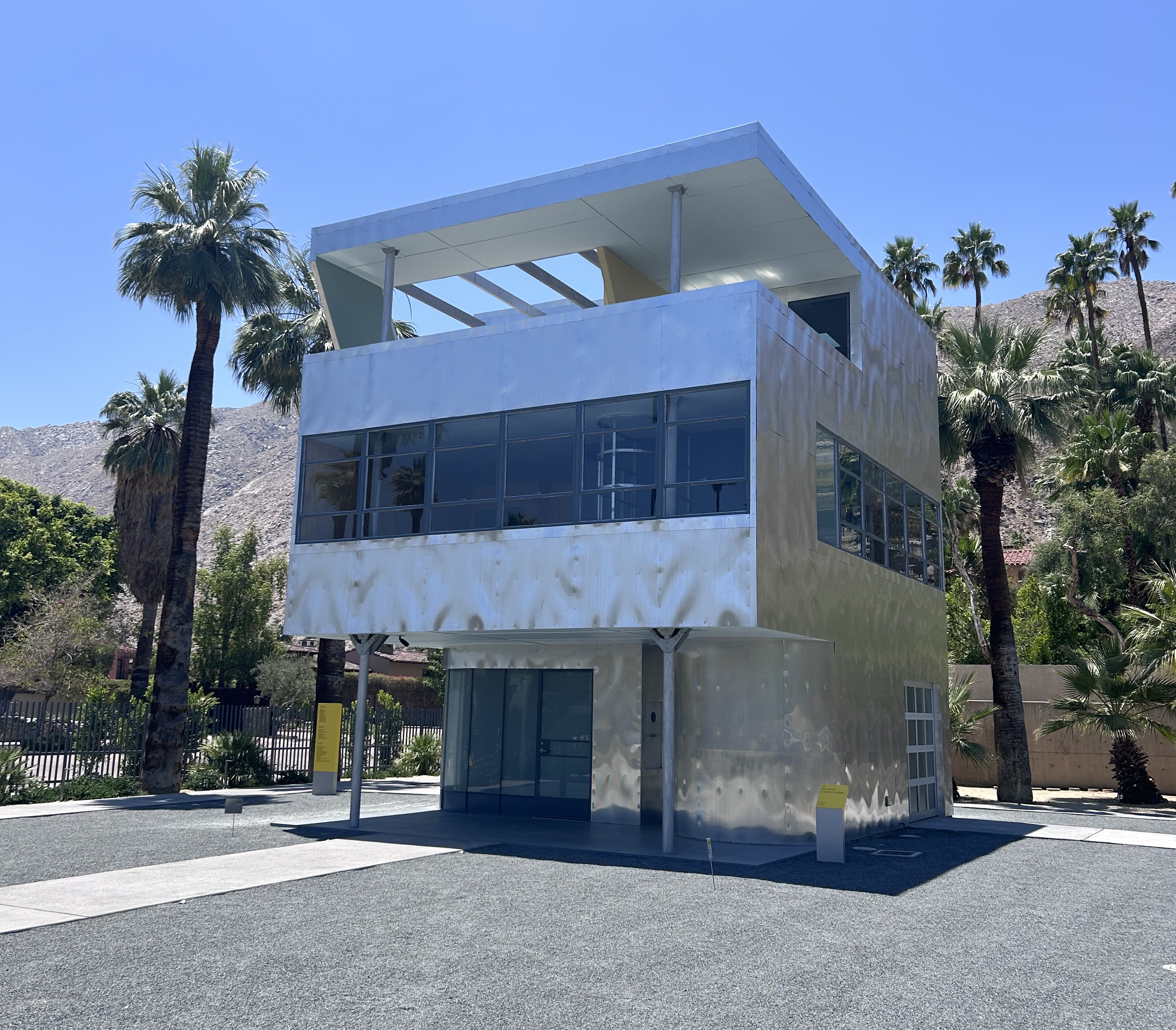
- Aluminaire House
  Awards program – Since 2004, PS ModCom has presented annual preservation awards to recognize restoration and conservation projects.
- Tours and education – The committee organizes tours, and educational events focused on Desert Modernism, including their Building Educational Architectural Models program which aims to educate elementary and high school students on mid-century modern architecture and design.
- Collaborations – The committee works with museums and cultural institutions, including the Palm Springs Art Museum, on exhibitions and programs related to mid-century modern design, including their financial support of the Aluminaire House exhibit.

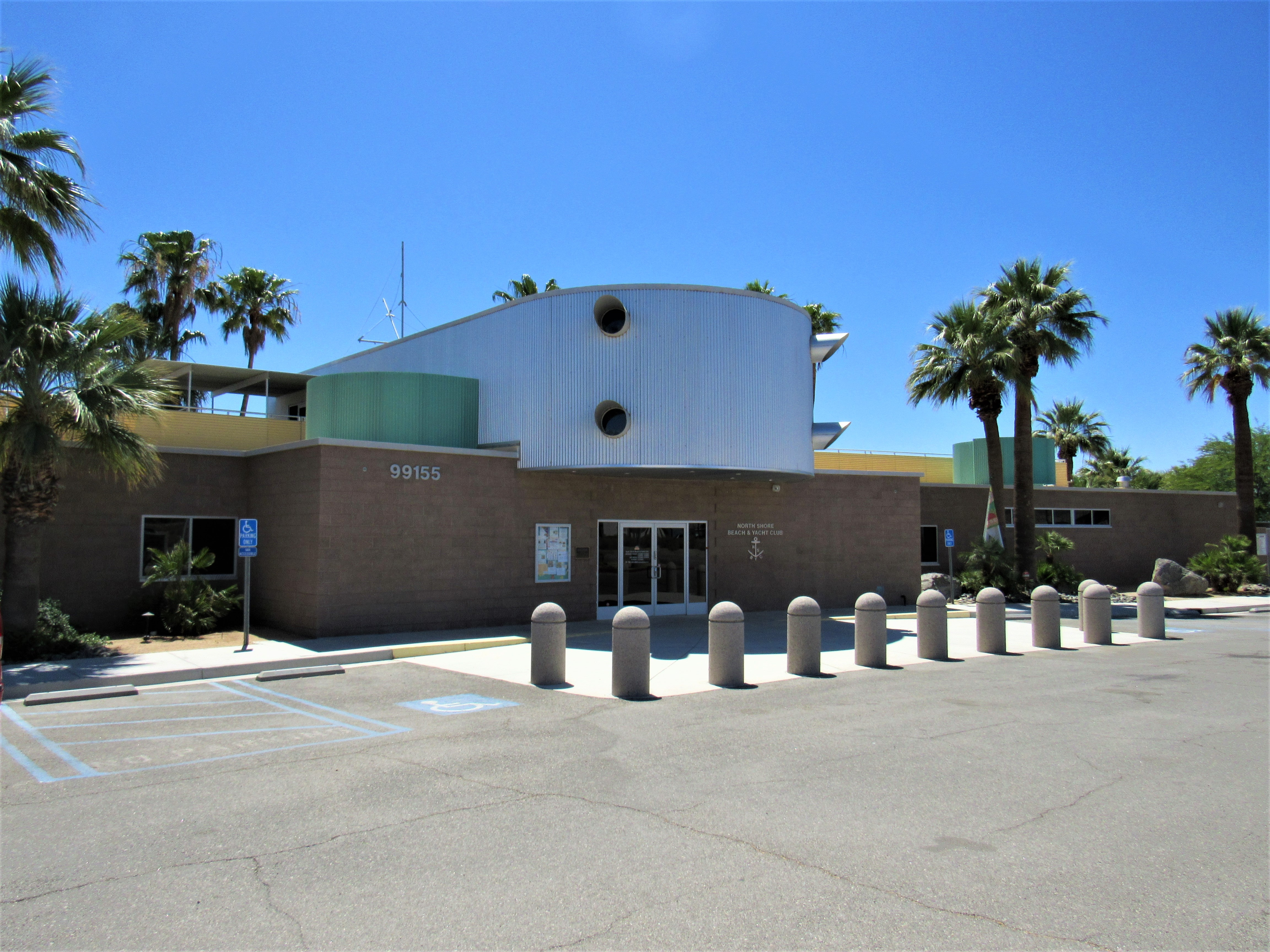
North Shore Yacht Club

== Notable projects and recognitions ==
PS ModCom has participated in several preservation and recognition projects:

- In 2009, the committee advocated for the restoration of the North Shore Yacht Club, which was designed in 1959 by Albert Frey. The property had been abandoned and was close to demolition when PS ModCom convinced Riverside County to restore the building as a community center. The building has since been listed on the National Register of Historic Places.
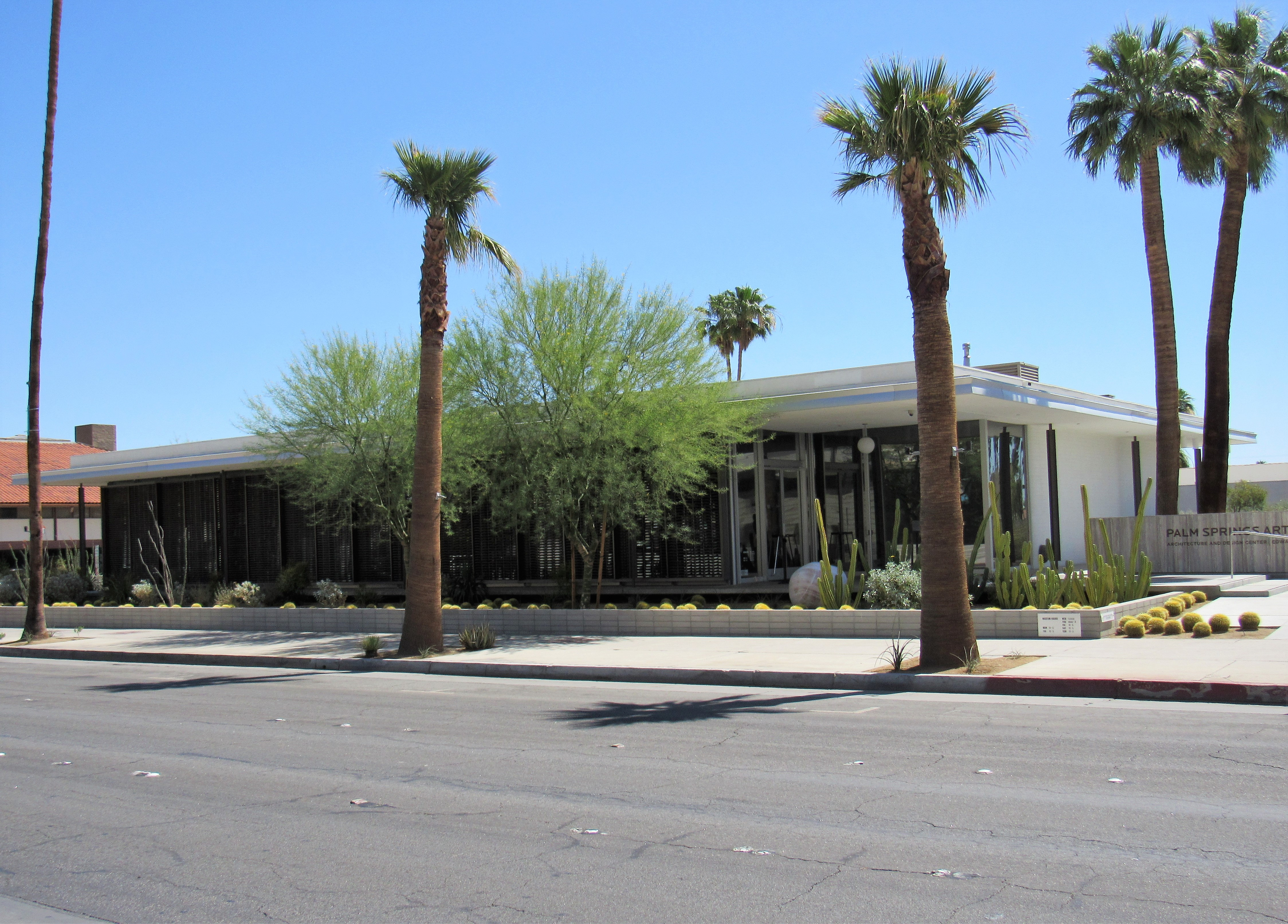
- Palm Springs Art Museum Architecture & Design Center
  In 2012, PS ModCom donated $25,000 to the Palm Springs Art Museum for the creation of the Architecture and Design Center that now occupies the former Santa Fe Federal Savings building, which was designated a Class One Historic Site by Palm Springs City Council in 2010.
- In 2014, it worked to prevent construction of an adjacent building that would have impacted the Santa Fe Federal Savings building. The building was listed on the National Register of Historic Places in 2016.
- In 2016, it supported the restoration of the JW Robinson Department Store.
- In 2017, the committee played a role in preventing Tahquitz Plaza (now named Kaptur Plaza), designed by Hugh Kaptur in the early 1970s, from being demolished. The owner had proposed significant changes to both the east and west buildings, which PS ModCom and others opposed. The building was sold to real estate developer Scott Timberlake, who restored it with guidance from Kaptur and architect Susan Secoy Jensen, and it was designated a Historic Site by Palm Springs City Council in 2015.
- In 2018, it presented a preservation award for the restoration of the Bel Vista House, designed by Albert Frey in 1946.
- In 2023, the committee recognized residential restoration projects in Marrakesh Country Club, a 1969 community designed by John Elgin Woolf.

== Modernism Week ==
PS ModCom participated in the early organization of Modernism Week, a citywide festival launched in 2006 to highlight mid-century architecture and design. Members helped plan the initial tours and programs, and the group remains an active partner in Modernism Week events, offering tours and presentations related to architectural preservation.

== Relationship to other organizations ==
PS ModCom is one of several organizations in Palm Springs focused on preservation and education. Unlike the Palm Springs Preservation Foundation, which also publishes monographs and undertakes research, PS ModCom concentrates on advocacy and recognition of projects through awards. It is distinct from the municipal Historic Site Preservation Board, which is a government body with regulatory authority, and from the Palm Springs Historical Society, which focuses on broader regional history.
