= Kaptur =

Kaptur is a Polish surname. Notable people with the surname include:

- Éva Kaptur (born 1987), Hungarian athlete
- Hugh M. Kaptur (born 1931), American architect
- Marcy Kaptur (born 1946), American politician
- Vadim Kaptur (born 1987), Belarusian diver
