= Palm Springs Historical Society =

Nonprofit Organization in California

- Palm Springs Historical Society Logo
- Formation: 1955
- Founder: Melba Berry Bennett
- Type: Nonprofit
- Legal status: 501(c)(3)
- Headquarters: Village Green Heritage Center, Palm Springs, California
- Region served: Palm Springs and Coachella Valley, California
- President: Tracy Conrad
- Website: Official Website

The Palm Springs Historical Society (PSHS) is a nonprofit organization in Palm Springs, California, with a mandate to preserve and share the history of Palm Springs and the Coachella Valley. Founded in 1955, the Society manages a collection of historic buildings, archives, and museums, and operates educational programs, including walking tours and public exhibits.

== History ==
PSHS was established in 1955 by Melba Berry Bennett, a local author and historian who encouraged the Palm Springs City Council and trustees of the Welwood Murray Memorial Library to create a permanent historical organization. Bennett had been recording oral histories of early settlers, including Nellie Coffman and Cornelia White, which became part of the Society's archives.

In 1961 the Society took responsibility for two of Palm Springs’ oldest surviving buildings, the Cornelia White House and the McCallum Adobe, which were restored and converted into public museums.

PSHS has oversight for a wide range of artifacts and maintains an extensive photographic archive. In 2015, its collections were transferred to a climate-controlled facility in the Welwood Murray Memorial Library, which was renovated to house the Society's Research Center.

In 2009 Palm Springs was designated a Preserve America Community, by the Advisory Council on Historic Preservation, partly as a result of the efforts of the PSHS.

== Museums and archives ==
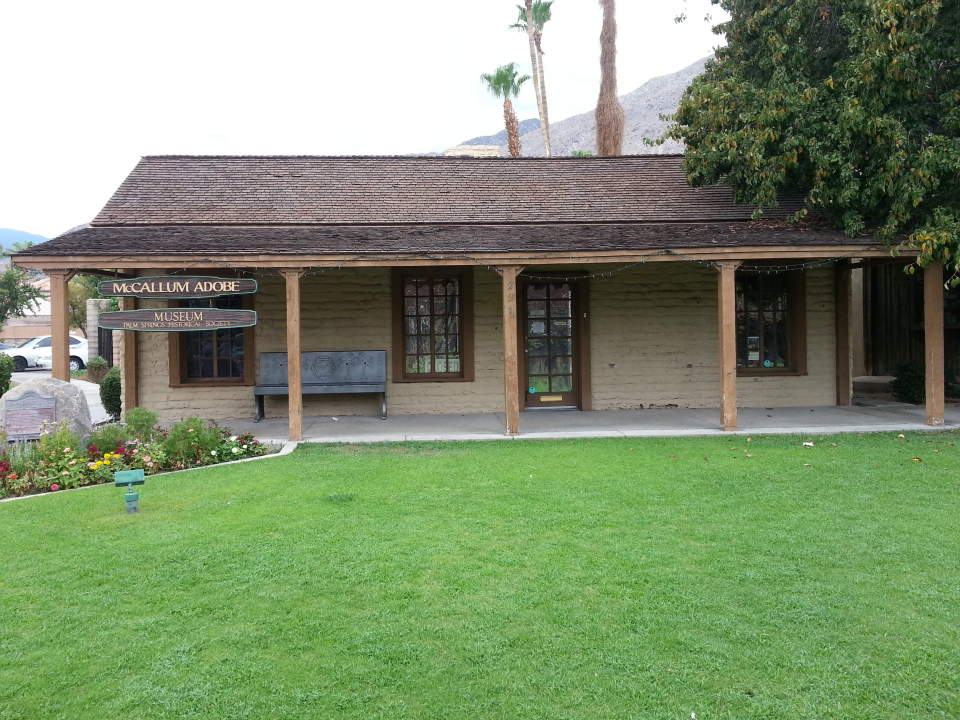
McCallum Adobe

The Palm Springs Historical Society manages several historic sites and cultural institutions in downtown Palm Springs:

- McCallum Adobe (1884) – The oldest surviving building in Palm Springs, built by settler John G. McCallum, now a museum interpreting early desert life.
- Cornelia White House (1893) – A pioneer-era wooden house constructed from railroad ties, located next to the McCallum Adobe at the Village Green.
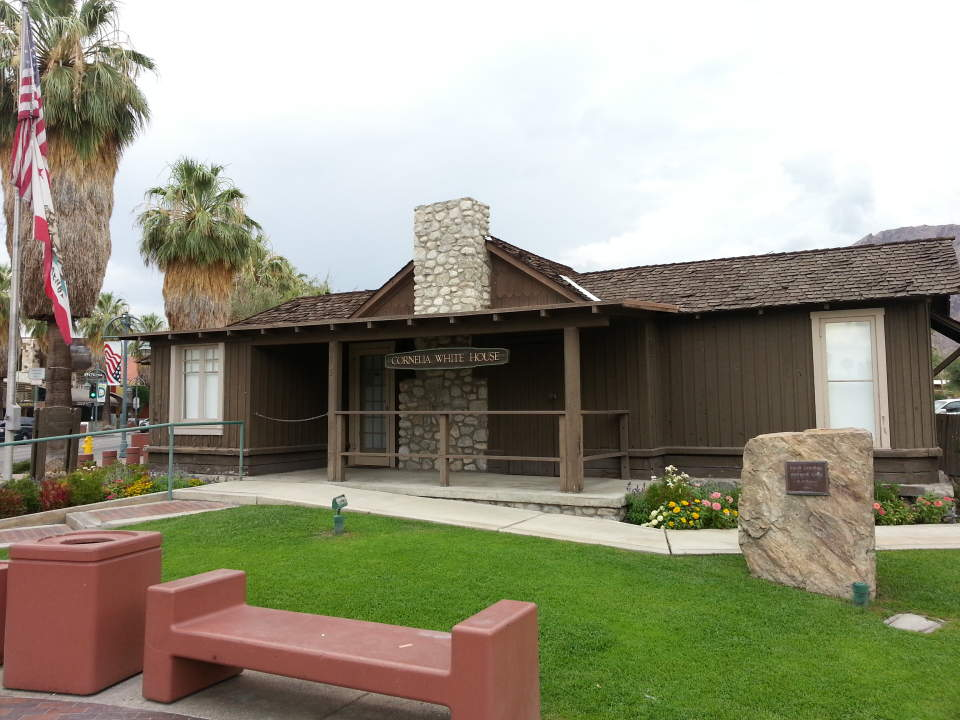
- Cornelia White House
  Ruddy's General Store Museum – A Depression-era general store recreation with more than 6,000 original unused products and fixtures collected by James Ruddy.
- The Oasis (Trini Lopez Exhibit) – An exhibit launched in 2025 highlighting the life and career of musician Trini Lopez.
- Welwood Murray Memorial Library (Archives) – Home to PSHS' Research Center, it contains photographs, maps, oral histories, and documents available to researchers.

== Programs and outreach ==
PSHS hosts guided walking and bike tours of Palm Springs neighborhoods and landmarks, which are led by volunteer docents. Tours highlight subjects such as celebrity homes, mid-century modern architecture, and historic buildings, as well as special site visits including the Welwood Murray Cemetery.

Since 2019 the Society partnered with The Desert Sun to publish the weekly history column "Intriguing Stories," written by local historians including Society president Tracy Conrad.

== Funding and support ==
In 2024 the Inland Empire Community Foundation announced a $4.5 million endowment gift from the estate of philanthropist Jane Lykken Hoff to support several local nonprofits, including PSHS. The endowment was established to provide ongoing funding for the benefactors in perpetuity.

== Relationship to other local preservation organizations ==
Palm Springs has several other organizations involved in the city's preservation efforts. The city's Historic Site Preservation Board was created in 1981 to review and recommend sites and districts for Class 1 and Class 2 historic designations. The Palm Springs Modern Committee was founded in 1999 as a nonprofit focused on mid-century modern architecture. The Palm Springs Preservation Foundation was established in 1997, focused on the preservation of the region's historic architecture and cultural resources. The Palm Springs Architectural Alliance, created in 2018, focuses on the preservation of the region's architectural heritage. Modernism Week is an independent nonprofit festival devoted to mid-century design and architecture.
