= Palm Springs Historic Site Preservation Board =

Preservation board in Palm Spring, California

Agency overview
- Formed: 1981
- Type: Municipal historic preservation board
- Jurisdiction: City of Palm Springs, California, U.S.
- Headquarters: Palm Springs, California
- Agency executives: Janet Hansen, Chair; Kurt Philip Bachman, Vice Chair; Jeffrey Herr, Board Member; Peter Moruzz, Board Member; Katherine Maschka-Hitchcock, Board Member; Eric McCready, Board Member; Michael Paonessa, Board Member; Sarah Yoon, Historic Preservation Officer
- Parent department: City of Palm Springs Planning Department
- Website: Official Website

The Palm Springs Historic Site Preservation Board (HSPB) is a board of the City of Palm Springs in California. Formed in 1981, HSPB identifies and evaluates potential historic sites and districts for designation, and advises the City Council on historic preservation matters.

The board also reviews proposed alterations or demolitions of designated historic districts and sites and sponsors educational programs such as the annual Preservation Matters Symposium.

== History ==
Efforts to create a historic preservation board began in the late 1970s after the demolition of the ticket booth of the downtown Plaza Theatre. In 1978, Palm Springs City Council member Bill Foster proposed a committee to review significant buildings before permits were issued. In 1981, Palm Springs City Council formally established the Historic Site Preservation Board within the city's Planning Department through an amendment to Chapter 8.05 of the Municipal Code.

In 1984, Palm Springs adopted its first Historic Preservation Ordinance, providing the HSPB with legal authority to designate local landmarks. Early designations included the Plaza Theatre and the El Mirador Hotel Tower.

In the 2020s, the board considered several high-profile matters, including the removal of a statue of former Mayor Frank Bogert from the grounds of City Hall, stalled rehabilitation projects at the Town & Country Center and Orchid Tree Inn, and the redevelopment of Class 3 properties such as the El Morocco Hotel and Palm Highlands Inn.

== Roles and responsibilities ==
The board consists of seven members appointed by the City Council for staggered terms, supported by a Historic Preservation Officer.

=== Designation process ===
The HSPB reviews nominations for Class 1 (landmark) and Class 2 (historic merit) resources, which are then forwarded to the City Council for final approval. Class 3 and 4 properties (undesignated but older structures) also fall under review when demolition or alterations are proposed.

=== Certificate of Appropriateness ===
Owners of designated historic resources must obtain a Certificate of Appropriateness from the HSPB before making major exterior changes, additions, or demolitions.

=== Advisory and educational role ===
The board advises the City Council and Planning Commission on historic preservation issues and sponsors educational programs.

== Programs and events ==
The board organizes the annual Preservation Matters Symposium, launched in 2014, featuring lectures, tours, and awards recognizing preservation achievements. As part of the symposium, HSPB launched the Preservation Matters Award and Certificate of Recognition in 2015. Recipients include:

- 2017 – May Sung (Certificate of Recognition)
- 2019 – Gary Johns (Preservation Matters Award), Hugh Kaptur (Certificate of Recognition)
- 2022 – Dick Burkett (Preservation Matters Award), Steven Keylon (Certificate of Recognition)
- 2023 – Barbara and Ron Marshall (Preservation Matters Award), Palm Springs Plaza Theatre Foundation (Certificate of Recognition)
- 2025 – Todd Hays (Preservation Matters Award)

== Relationship to other organizations ==
Palm Springs has multiple preservation groups distinct from the HSPB:

- The Palm Springs Preservation Foundation, a nonprofit founded in 1997, sponsors designation nominations and publishes historical research.
- The Palm Springs Historical Society, founded in 1955, operates museums and maintains archives but does not participate in regulatory designations.
- The Palm Springs Modern Committee, founded in 1999, advocates for the preservation of modernist architecture through activism and public programming.
- The Palm Springs Architectural Alliance, created in 2018, focuses on the preservation of the region's architectural heritage.

== See also ==
- Historic Site Preservation Board Official Website
- List of Palm Springs Class 1 historic sites
