= Organized Neighborhoods of Palm Springs =

Neighborhood Organization in Palm Springs, CA, USA

- Abbreviation: ONE-PS
- Formation: 2005
- Type: Nonprofit organization
- Legal status: 501(c)(4)
- Purpose: Neighborhood advocacy and civic engagement
- Headquarters: Palm Springs, California, U.S.
- Members: 52 neighborhood organizations (2026)
- Chair: Chris Ruetz (2026)
- Website: www.one-ps.org

Organized Neighborhoods of Palm Springs (ONE-PS) is a nonprofit association of officially recognized neighborhood organizations in Palm Springs, California. It is organized as a California nonprofit public benefit 501(c)(4) corporation.

Established in 2005 by the Palm Springs City Council, and codified under the Palm Springs Municipal Code, ONE-PS serves as the legally designated coordinating body between the city government and its 52 recognized neighborhood organizations.

== History ==
In 2005, the Palm Springs City Council created the Office of Neighborhood Involvement to formalize the city's relationship with informal neighborhood groups and establish a process for official recognition. The civic initiative was codified in Palm Springs Municipal Code, Chapter 2.55 (Ordinance 1666), with the stated purpose of creating "a framework to include people of the city of Palm Springs in civic affairs to work to improve livability and character of their neighborhoods and the city." The organizing committee was initially called the Palm Springs Neighborhood Involvement Committee (PSNIC), and launched with eight neighborhoods.

By 2012, the number of city-recognized neighborhood organizations had increased to 32. In 2015, Palm Springs City Council amended Chapter 2.55 of the Municipal Code to rename PSNIC to Organized Neighborhoods of Palm Springs (ONE-PS), establishing it as its own legal entity and formalizing its role as the city-wide coordinating body for recognized neighborhood organizations. The ordinance was subsequently amended again in 2018 (Ordinance 1952) to reflect the organization's expanded scope. By January 2022, the network had grown to 50 recognized neighborhood organizations, reaching 52 by 2024.

ONE-PS is also a member of the national organization Neighborhoods USA (NUSA).

== Organization and relationship with the city ==
ONE-PS operates as a network of neighborhood-based organizations, each holding one voting eat and one alternate seat on the organization's governing body. ONE-PS is governed by a board of directors elected from the neighborhood representatives. The organization meets regularly with neighborhood representatives and city officials to discuss municipal issues affecting local residents.

Although independent from the City of Palm Springs, ONE-PS has a formal relationship with the city established by ordinance. Under Chapter 2.55 of the Municipal Code, city department heads are required to give ONE-PS advance notice before undertaking actions that may affect residents, including development projects, public works projects, special events, nuisance abatements, and ordinance adoptions. The City Manager is required to meet with ONE-PS at least semi-annually to evaluate whether timely notice of city actions has been provided, and Palm Springs City Council assigns a Councilmember to serve as the formal liaison to ONE-PS.

The City's Office of Neighborhoods, coordinates official communication between city departments and recognized neighborhood organizations, and provides administrative support for community programs. City officials have stated that ONE-PS provides a valuable channel for neighborhood input.

== Activities ==
ONE-PS and its member neighborhoods organize community programs and events in partnership with the city. Since 2008, the organization has hosted an annual Picnic & Community Expo in collaboration with the City of Palm Springs. The event features informational booths from city departments, local organizations and neighborhood groups. The 17th annual event, held on March 21, 2026, drew an estimated 1,100 attendees across more than 90 booths and nearly 100 organizations and sponsors, making it the largest event in the Picnic's history.

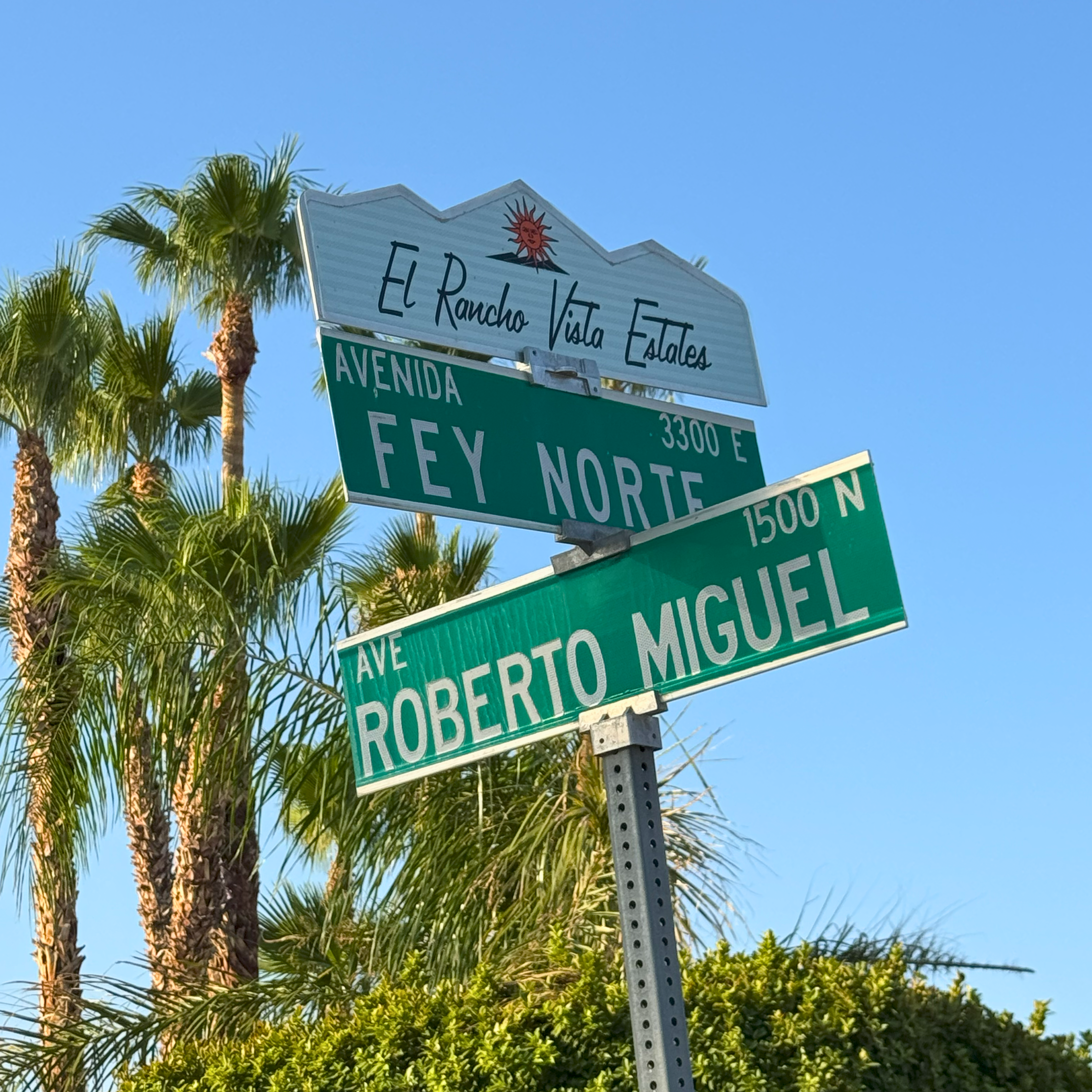
Blade sign of El Rancho Vista Estates, a neighborhood in Palm Springs, California

ONE-PS worked with the city to implement a neighborhood identification sign program that places unique "blade signs" marking the boundaries of the recognized neighborhoods.

The organization publishes the ONE-PS Guide to Palm Springs Neighborhoods, a directory of the city's recognized neighborhoods. The guide received first-place in the printed publication category at the 2017 Neighborhoods USA’s awards.

Member neighborhoods, through ONE-PS, organize community improvement projects, including community clean-ups, "little library" book exchanges, and public safety initiatives in cooperation with the Palm Springs Police Department. ONE-PS also partners with the Palm Springs Parks Foundation and the city's Parks and Recreation Department on neighborhood park improvements, including share structures, water features, and public programming.

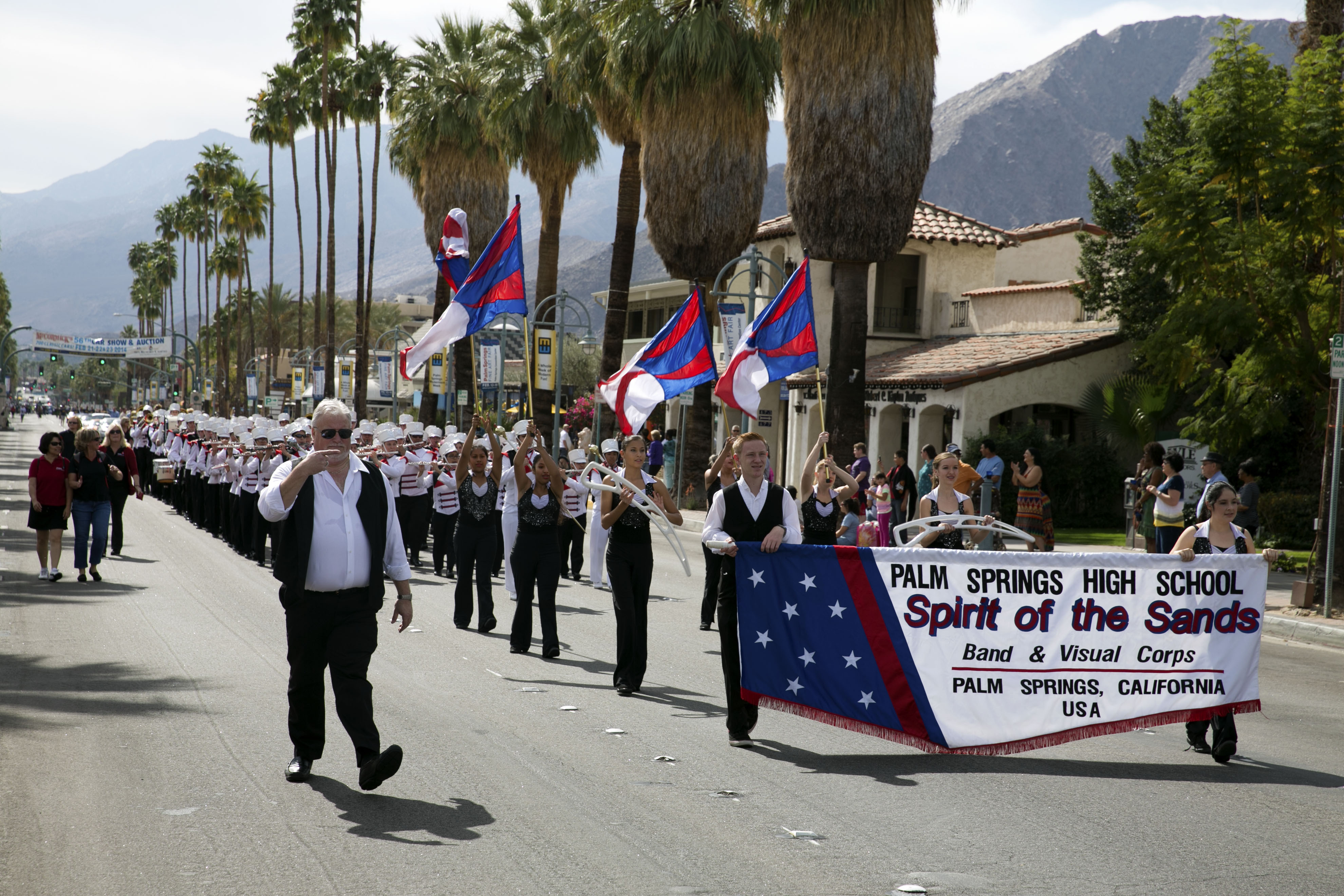
Color guard leads the way during black history parade

ONE-PS also participates in community events and celebrations, including the annual Black History Month Parade and Fair, Veterans Day Parade, and the Palm Springs Festival of Lights parade. The organization has also collaborated with Modernism Week to provide guided tours of historic Palm Springs neighborhoods, highlighting the city's mid-century modern architecture.

== Neighborhoods of Distinction Awards ==
In 2025, ONE-PS established the annual Neighborhoods of Distinction Awards to recognize outstanding contributions by member neighborhoods and individual residents. The inaugural ceremony was held on December 9, 2025, at the Palm Springs Police Training Center and was hosted by NBC Palm Springs anchor Fred Roggin.

The inaugural awards recognized four neighborhoods and four individual residents:

=== Neighborhoods recognized ===
- Baristo
- Vista Las Palmas
- Old Las Palmas
- Tahquitz Creek Golf

=== Individuals recognized ===
- Brian Ramos (Little Beverly Hills)
- Peter Sipkins (Melody Ranch)
- Ken Alexander (Upper West Side)
- Robert Silberstein (Andreas Hills)

== Neighborhoods USA collaboration ==
In 2019, Palm Springs hosted the annual Neighborhoods USA conference, themed "Opening Doors to the Future." The event included workshops and presentations focused on leading practices in community engagement and neighborhood development. Palm Springs has held federal recognition as a Preserve America community since October 2009, a designation awarded by the Advisory Council of Historic Preservation, in recognition of the city's commitment to heritage preservation and civic engagement.

=== Neighborhoods USA Awards ===
ONE-PS has received recognition from NUSA for several of its programs and initiatives:

- 2019: Finalist in the "Neighborhood of the Year" awards, in the category of "Social Revitalization - Single Neighborhood" for the Black History Parade & Fair.
- 2017: First place in the "Best Neighborhood Newsletter Competition" awards, in the category of "Non-Profit Agency Printed" for the ONE-PS Guide to Palm Springs Neighborhoods.
- 2016: Third place in the "Best Neighborhood Program Award", in the category of "Physical Revitalization" for the Clinton Day of Action Orchard Planning and Beautification.
- 2015: Third place in the "Best Neighborhood Newsletter Competition", in the category of "Electronic Division" for the ONE-PS Guide to Palm Springs Neighborhoods.
- 2014: Third place in the "Best Neighborhood Program Award" for the Annual Neighborhood Picnic & Community Expo.
- 2014: Fourth place in the "Best Neighborhood Program Award" for the Identification Blade Sign Program.
- 2014: Gold in the "Best Neighborhood Newsletter Competition", in the category of "Electronic Format" received by the Los Compadres Neighborhood Organization.
- 2014: Gold in the "Best Neighborhood Newsletter Competition", in the category of "Electronic Format" received by the Tahquitz River Estates Neighborhood Organization.
