= Samuel and Luella Maslon House =

Historical home in California

Coordinates: 33.7548°N 116.4300°W

The Maslon House was a mid-century modern house designed by the architect Richard Neutra in 1962 for the art collectors Samuel and Luella Maslon in Rancho Mirage, California. It was demolished in 2002. The house was situated within the Tamarisk Country Club golf course.

The house also held the Maslons’ collection of modern art; the couple wanted Neutra to design them a house that combined their ideas with those of Frank Lloyd Wright.

== Location ==
In New York Times, Brad Dunning wrote of the house that "Seldom was a home afforded such a perfect site. The Maslons' house was surrounded on all sides by the unworldly green expanse of round-the-clock irrigated turf, isolated like an architectural model and spared the indignity of rubbing elbows with lesser creations... This was Neutra with deep pockets on a breathtaking site with luxurious appointments. It's soaring, exaggerated (even for Neutra) flat-roof overhangs protected the artwork within from the harsh desert sun. Ingenious built-ins camouflaged resort necessities, like barbecues, charcoal bins and steam trays. Posh living on the links."

== Sale and demolition ==
Following Luella Maslon's death, the house was sold for $2.45 million through Sotheby's, which also later held an auction of the Maslons’ art collection. The new owner of the house applied for a demolition permit, which was approved by the city of Rancho Mirage; the house was demolished within a week. Following the house's demolition, the listing agent for the sale described herself as "Devastated, absolutely devastated, and embarrassed to have been any part of it". Brad Dunning, writing in the New York Times, reported that Rancho Mirage's city manager "...said he had no idea who the architect was or what the house represented". The chairman of the preservation group, the Palm Springs Modern Committee, Peter Moruzzi, said that the house was "without a doubt the most significant piece of architecture in Rancho Mirage, and now it is gone".
