= Alan Hess =

American architect

Alan Hess (born 1952) is an American architect, author, lecturer and advocate for twentieth-century architectural preservation.

"Alan Hess [is] a prominent California architecture critic who has written extensively on roadside strips," writes The New York Times (March 6, 1994). Through 2012, Alan has written and/or co-authored twenty books, published numerous articles on the architecture of Googie, Las Vegas, Frank Lloyd Wright, Oscar Niemeyer, John Lautner, Ranch Houses, Palm Springs, Organic architecture, Mid-century Modern design, and suburbia. He has been the architecture critic for the San Jose Mercury News since 1986.

== Biography ==
Born in California in 1952, Hess received his BA at Principia College, a master's degree in architecture from the UCLA School of the Arts and Architecture, and to become a licensed architect. After working with architects William Coburn, and Callister Payne and Bischoff, Hess started his own firm specializing in residential work and historic preservation. His first book, Googie: Fifties Coffee Shop Architecture (Chronicle Books 1985) focused on a neglected and popular Modern form. Following books continued to explore overlooked chapters in twentieth-century architecture and urbanism. He is responsible for qualifying several landmark buildings for the National Register of Historic Places, including the oldest operating McDonald's in Downey, Stuart Company Plant and Office Building and Bullock's Pasadena in Pasadena, and the Hotel Valley Ho in Scottsdale, Arizona.

Through his writing, lectures, and educational outreach, Hess worked to bring awareness to many forgotten and neglected styles of postwar American architecture, especially in the realm of commercial modern architecture. A particular focus was Googie architecture, and he "practically defined Googie as a genre" according to Chris Ziegler. Googie coffee shops, Hess said, "brought modern architecture to ordinary people in their everyday lives." Hess has also written on other architects such as Frank Lloyd Wright, Edward Durell Stone, Stanley Clark Meston, John Lautner, William Pereira, and Oscar Niemeyer as well as on styles such as the Palm Springs School of Architecture, and as of 2025 has written 22 books on architectural history. He has also advocated for architectural preservation.

The Los Angeles Conservancy has named him "The preeminent authority on Southern California Modernism." He won the group's "President's Award" in 2015.

== Published works ==
- Googie: Fifties Coffee Shop Architecture (Chronicle Books, 1985)
- Viva Las Vegas: After-Hours Architecture (Chronicle Books, 1993)
- Hyperwest: American Residential Architecture on the Edge (Whitney Library of Design, 1996)
- The Architecture of John Lautner (Rizzoli, 1999)
- Rancho Deluxe (Chronicle Books, 2000)
- Palm Springs Weekend: The Architecture and Design of a Midcentury Oasis. San Francisco, CA: Chronicle Books. 2001. p. 180. ISBN 9780811828048. (coauthor: Andrew Danish)
- Googie Redux: Ultramodern Roadside Architecture (Chronicle Books, 2004)
- The Ranch House (H.N. Abrams, 2004)
- Organic Architecture: The Other Modernism (Gibbs Smith, 2006)
- Frank Lloyd Wright: Houses (Rizzoli, 2006)
- Frank Lloyd Wright: the Buildings (Rizzoli, 2008)
- Frank Lloyd Wright: Mid-Century Modern (Rizzoli, 2008)
- Frank Lloyd Wright: Prairie Houses (Rizzoli, 2006)
- Oscar Niemeyer Houses (Rizzoli, 2006)
- Oscar Niemeyer Buildings (Rizzoli, 2009)
- Forgotten Modern: California Houses 1940-1970 (Gibbs Smith, 2008)
- Casa Modernista: A History of the Brazil Modern House (Rizzoli, 2010)
- Julius Shulman: Palm Springs (Rizzoli, 2008) (coauthor: Michael Stern)
- Frank Lloyd Wright: Natural Design, Organic Architecture (Rizzoli, 2012)
