= Modernism Week =

Mid-century architecture and design event in Palm Springs, California, United States

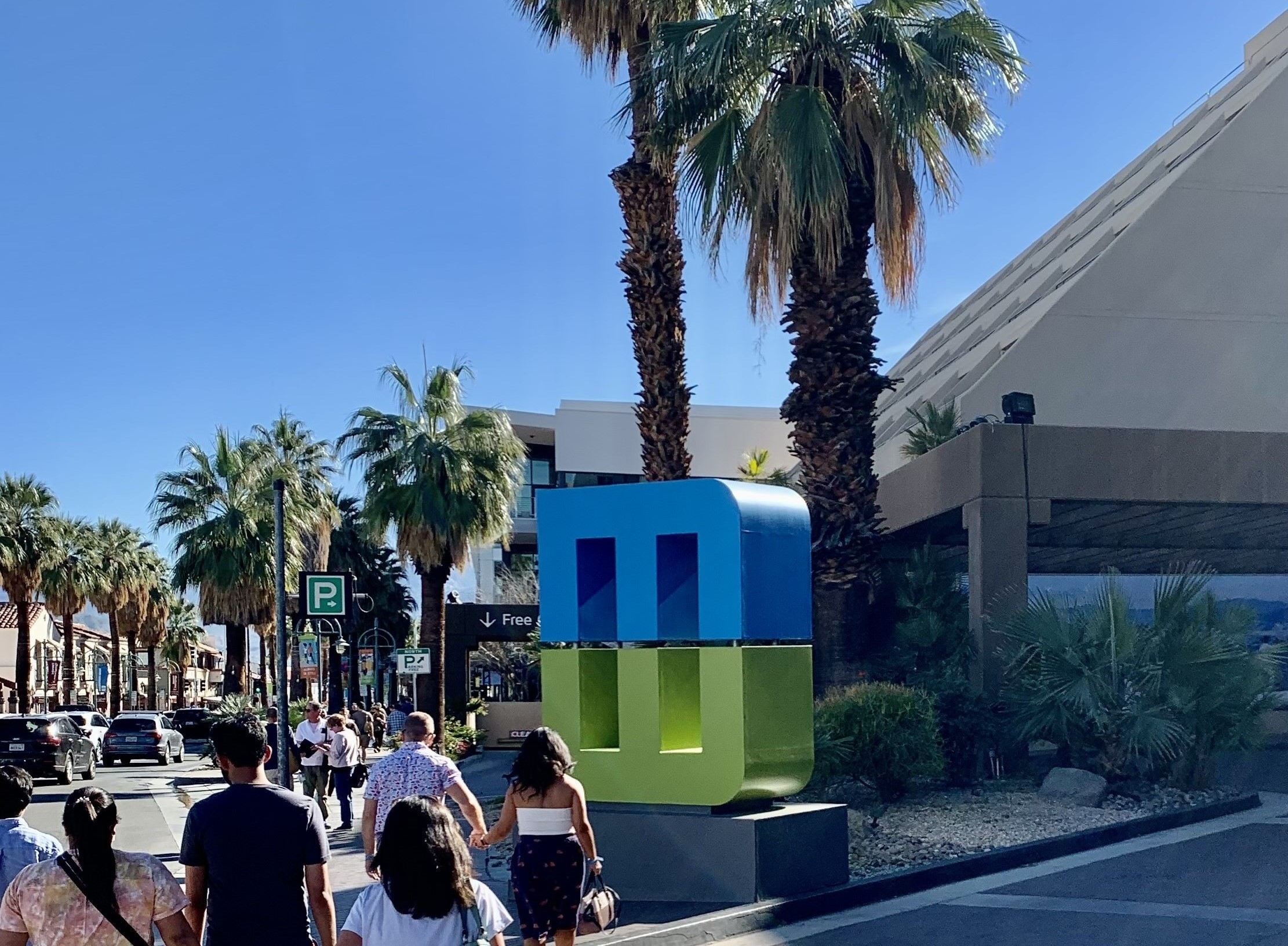
- Modernism Week in February 2022
- Location: Palm Springs, California
- Website: http://www.modernismweek.com/

Modernism Week is a 501(c)(3) organization based in Palm Springs, California that provides public education programming fostering knowledge and appreciation of modern architecture, the mid-century modern architecture and design movement, the Palm Springs School of Architecture, as well as contemporary considerations surrounding historic preservation, cultural heritage, adaptive reuse, and sustainable architecture. Modernism Week provides annual scholarships to local students pursuing college educations in the fields of architecture and design and supports local and state organizations' efforts to preserve and promote the region's modern architecture. The organization is centered in the Coachella Valley, which is home to a significant collection of extant residential and commercial buildings designed in the mid-century modern vernacular.

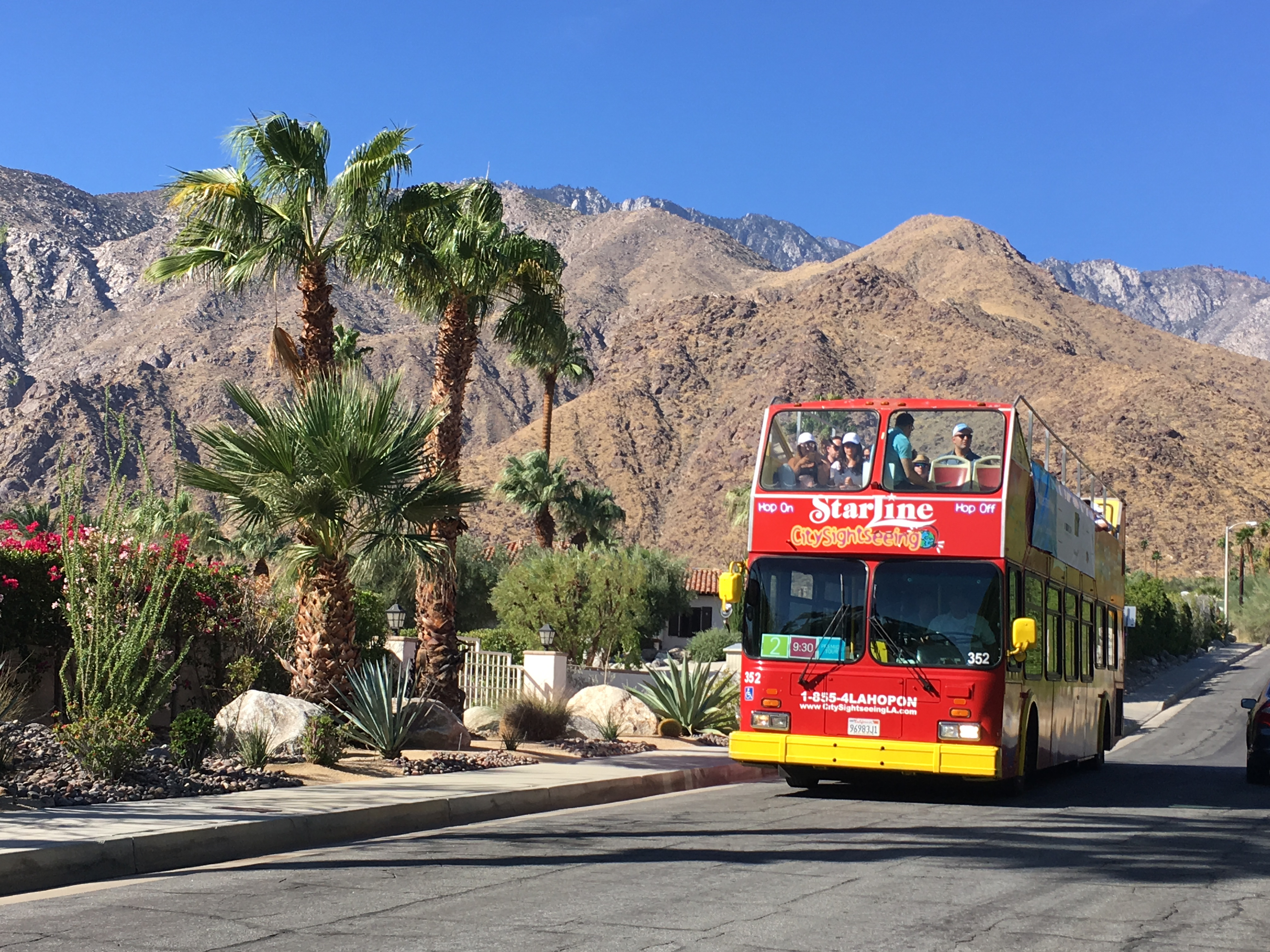
Modernism Week architectural bus tour in Palm Springs

== Description ==
The primary event for the organization is an annual, eleven-day, region-wide advocacy and educational festival called "Modernism Week" which is held each February. Events are produced by Modernism Week and partner organizations and include symposia, films, lectures, tours, and a variety of opportunities to access architecturally significant buildings not otherwise available to the public. Educational programs explore the mid-century modern era as it applies to architecture, design, landscape, preservation, and culture. In addition to the primary event held each February, Modernism Week offers Modernism Week-October (previously called the "Fall Preview"), a four-day event held each October. This "mini-Modernism Week" was developed to provide additional educational opportunities to seasonal visitors.

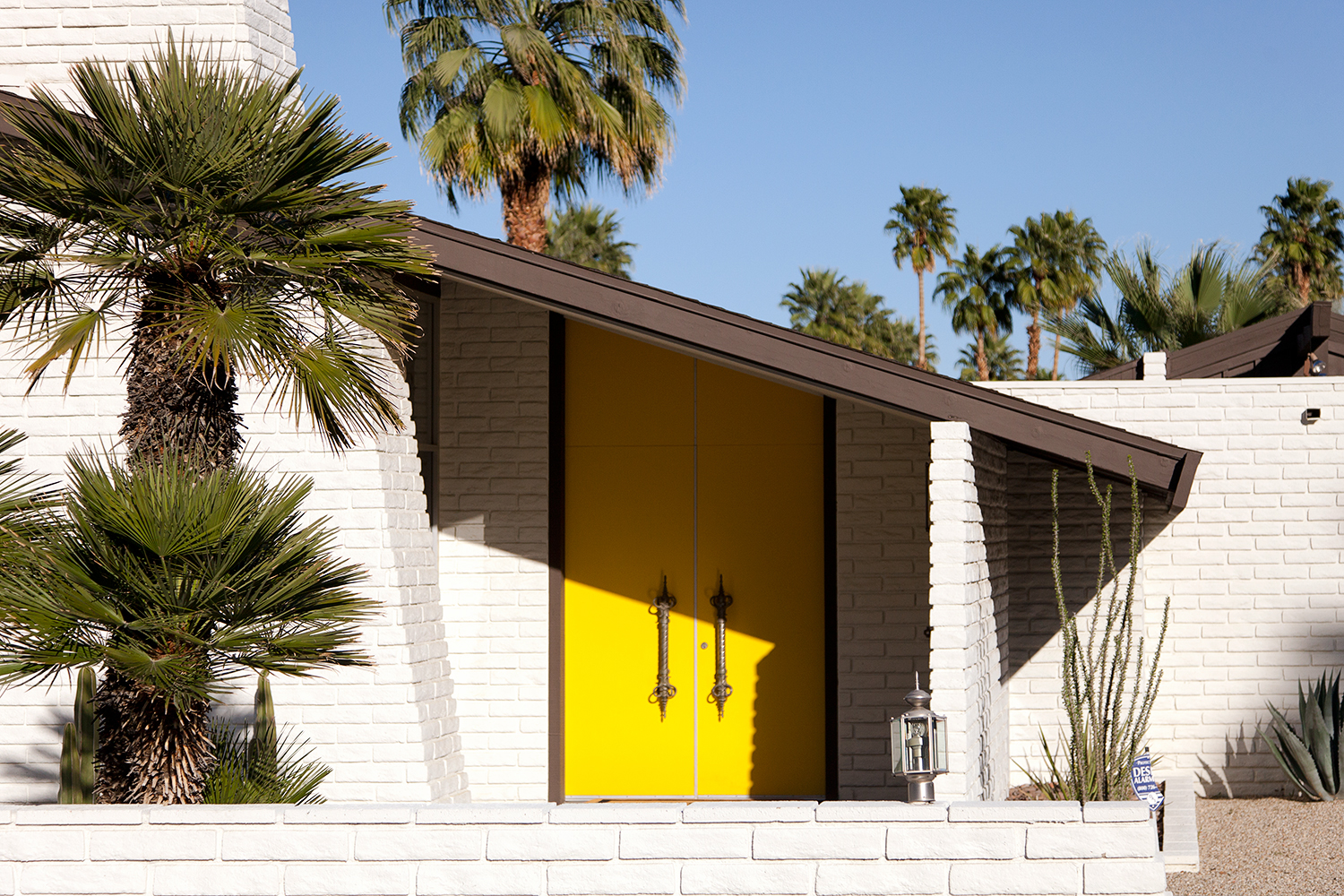
Mid-century modern house in Palm Springs

== History ==
Modernism Week began in 2006 as an adjunct to two existing programs exploring mid-century architecture and design: the Palm Springs Modernism Show & Sale and the annual Palm Springs Art Museum Architecture & Design Council Symposium. The National Trust for Historic Preservation named Palm Springs, California to its 2006 list of America's Dozen Distinctive Destinations, an annual list highlighting cultural tourism destinations for architecture. In 2009, Palm Springs was included on the List of Preserve America Communities and was welcomed to the program in a letter by then-First Lady Michelle Obama. In 2009, Modernism Week became a California 501(c)(3) non-profit organization. In 2015, a physical headquarters for the event was launched enabling visitors to gather at a central location throughout the festival. Dubbed, CAMP (Community And Meeting Place), this festival hub provides services and programs throughout the festival including serving as a depot for bus tours, educational programming, ticket sales, demonstrations, social events, and the distribution of general information.

== Attendance ==
From 2012 to 2018, annual attendance increased from 12,000 to 125,000. The number of programmed events in 2018 was 350 with attendees representing the 50 United States and 19 countries.

In 2019, attendance increased 20% over 2018 to an estimated 152,000 participating in over 370 events resulting in an estimated economic impact for the Coachella Valley of $57 million. International visitors from 25 countries participated alongside attendees from all 50 United States. California residents accounted for the majority of attendees (54 percent) representing 445 of 482 cities in California. In February 2020, attendance was estimated at 162,000 across 375 events resulting in an estimated economic impact of $61 million. Attendees represented all 50 United States and 25 countries.

In response to the COVID-19 pandemic 2021 and 2022 programming shifted to virtual and later, reduced in-person programming achieving a local economic impact of $50 million in 2022 as state restrictions associated with the pandemic lifted.

In 2023, the 11-day February festival attracted an estimated 105,477 attendees who participated in more than 350 events generating a local economic impact of $55 million. Attendees represented all 50 states and 25 countries. In February 2024, the 11-day festival attracted more than 130,000 attendees representing all fifty US states and twenty-four countries including Canada, Australia, the United Kingdom, New Zealand, Germany, and France. Attendees came from 440 of 482 cities in California, or 91% of all California cities. The festival generated an estimated economic impact of $68 million for Coachella Valley-area hotels, shops, restaurants, and other businesses.

In 2025, Modernism Week celebrated their 20th anniversary. The festival in 2025, expanded its program to more than 500 events – a new record – over the course of its 11-day festival. Modernism Week attendees came from all fifty United States and the District of Columbia, with California accounting for the majority of attendees (approximately 45%). Attendees came from 460 of 482 cities in California, or 95% of all California cities and 25 countries, including Canada, Australia, the United Kingdom, and Germany. This year’s event generated an estimated economic impact of $62.7 million, contributing to a cumulative total of more than $500 million since its inception two decades ago.

== Notable speakers ==
- Todd Oldham in 2015 and 2020 and 2025
- Martyn Lawrence Bullard in 2018
- Moshe Safdie in 2019
- Daniel Libeskind in 2020
- Barbara Bestor in 2022
- Jeanne Gang in 2022
- Thom Mayne in 2023
- Barry Bergdoll in 2024
- Dr. Raymond Neutra in 2025
- Elizabeth Diller in 2026

== Notable Palm Springs-region architects, designers, and developers of the era ==
- George Alexander
- Barry Berkus
- Buff, Smith and Hensman
- Herbert Burns
- Robson Chambers
- John Porter Clark
- William Francis Cody
- Richard Lee Dorman
- Charles Du Bois
- Craig Ellwood
- Arthur Elrod
- Edward Fickett
- Albert Frey
- Victor Gruen
- William Haines
- Richard Harrison
- A. Quincy Jones
- Hugh M. Kaptur
- William Krisel
- Howard Lapham
- John Lautner
- Raymond Loewy
- Harold Levitt
- James McNaughton
- Wallace Neff
- Richard Neutra
- William Pereira
- Val Powelson
- Robert Ricciardi
- Stan Sackly
- Laszlo Sandor
- Rudolph Schindler
- Paul Trousdale
- John Carl Warnecke
- Erle Webster and Adrian Wilson
- Donald Wexler
- Walter S. White
- Paul Revere Williams
- E. Stewart Williams
- John Elgin Woolf
- Lloyd Wright

== Gallery ==
Mid-century modern home built by the Alexander Construction Company, Palm Springs, California

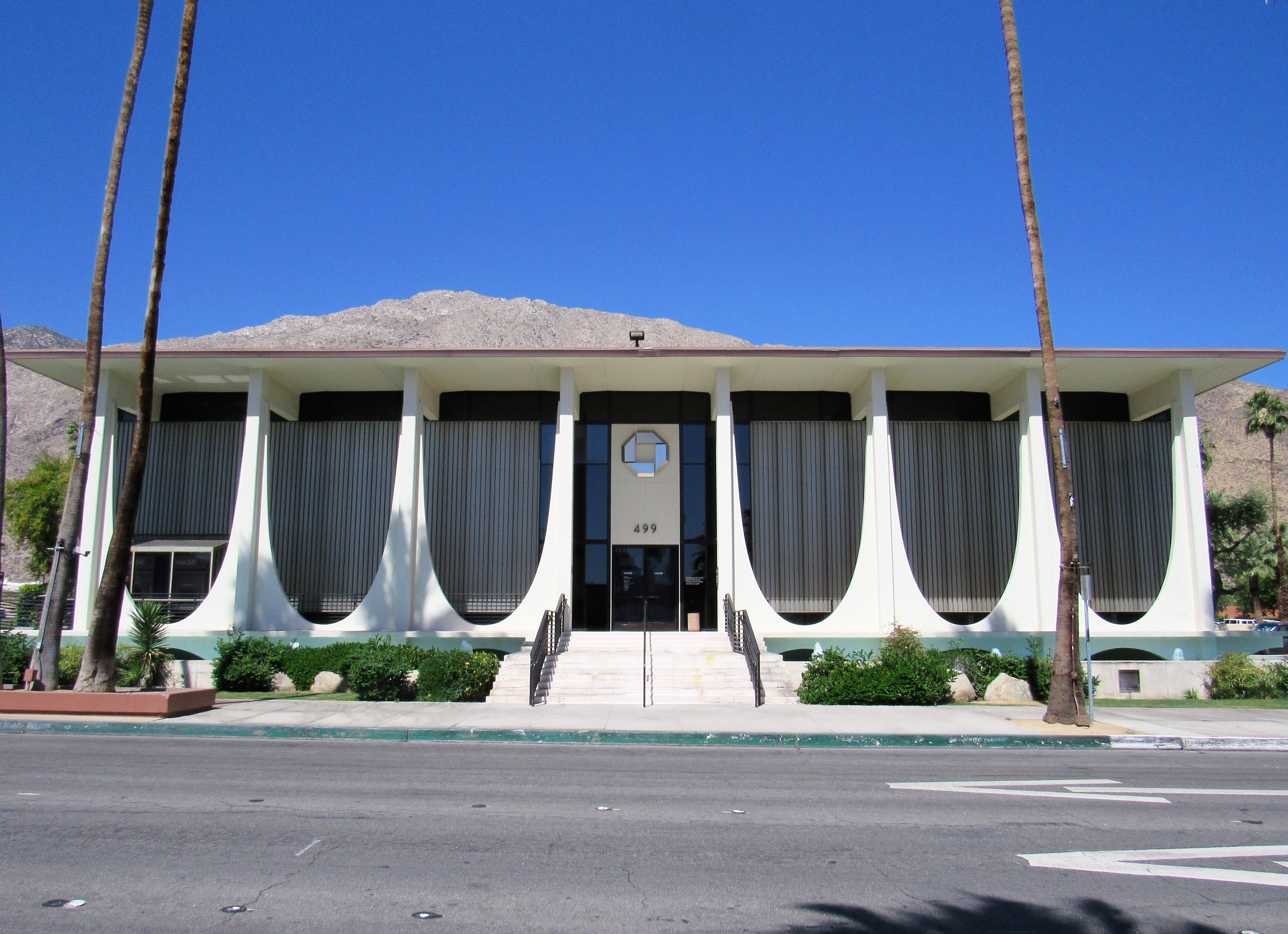
Coachella Valley Savings, Palm Springs, 1960 by E. Stewart Williams

Frank Sinatra's Twin Palms Estate, Palm Springs, 1947 by E. Stewart Williams

Interior of Elvis Presley honeymoon house, Palm Springs

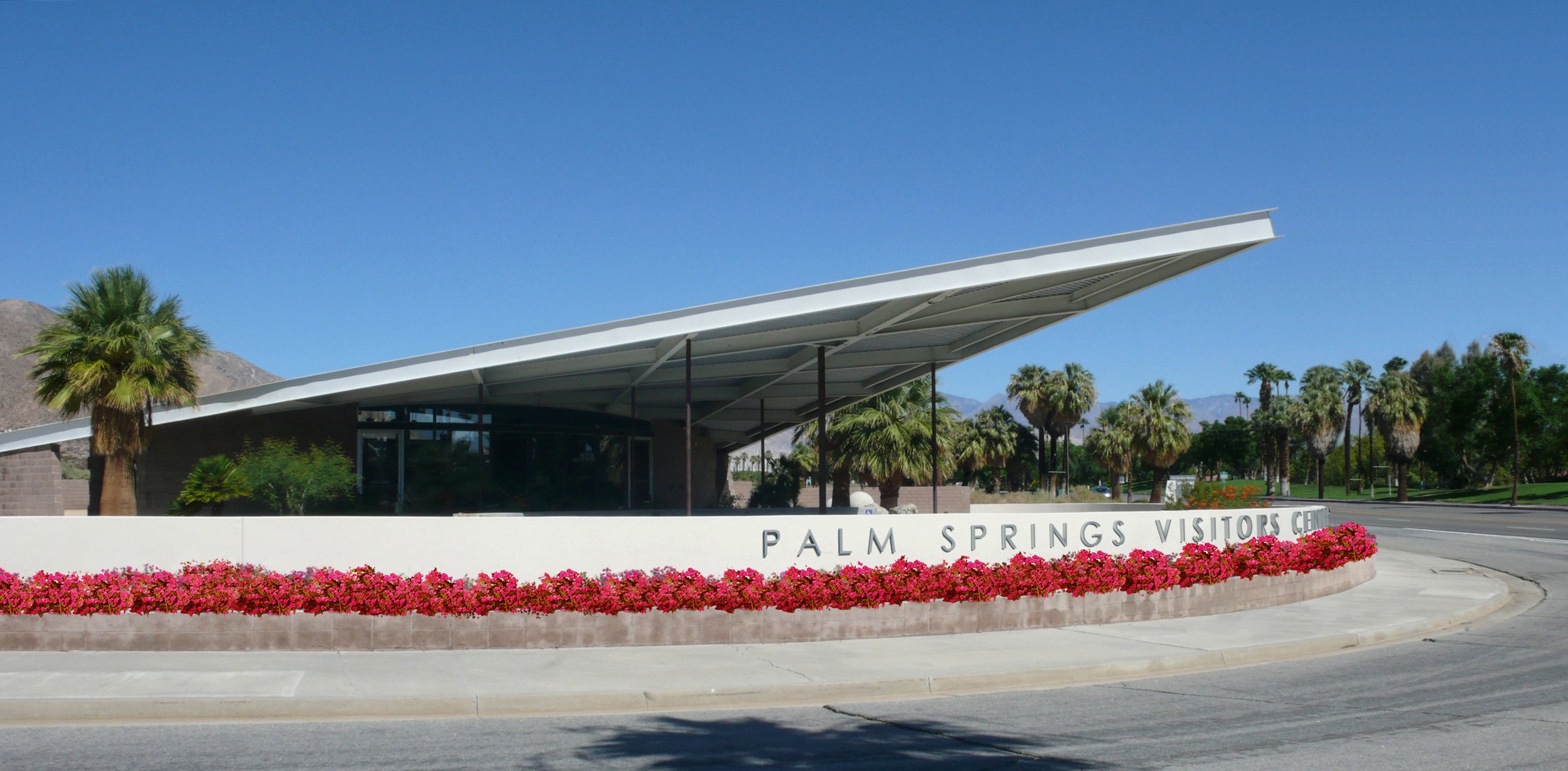
Albert Frey's Tramway Gas Station, 1965, now the Palm Springs Visitor Center

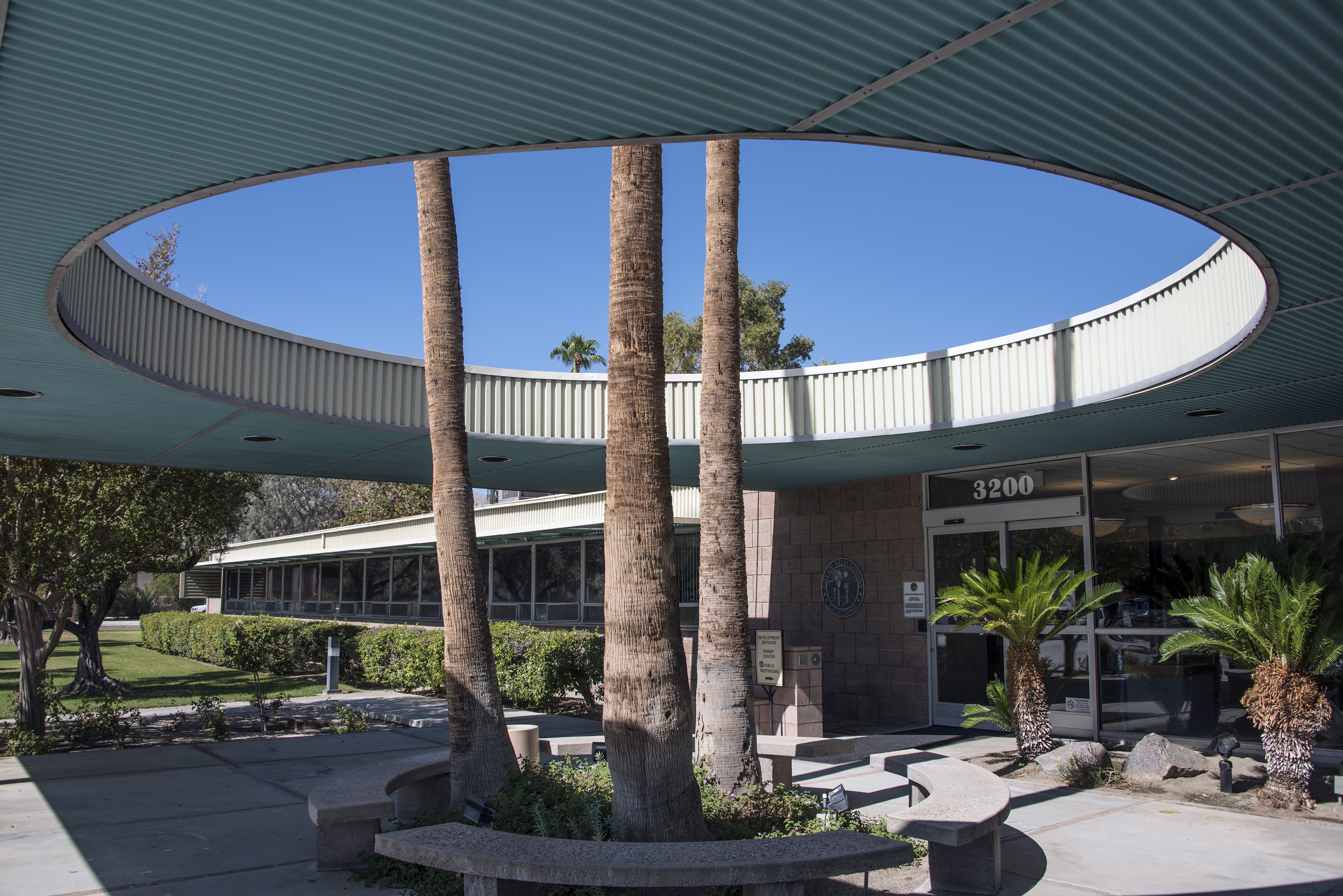
Palm Springs City Hall, 1952 by Albert Frey

Palm Springs mid-century bank building, 1959, by Rudi Baumfeld
