= Richard Lee Dorman =

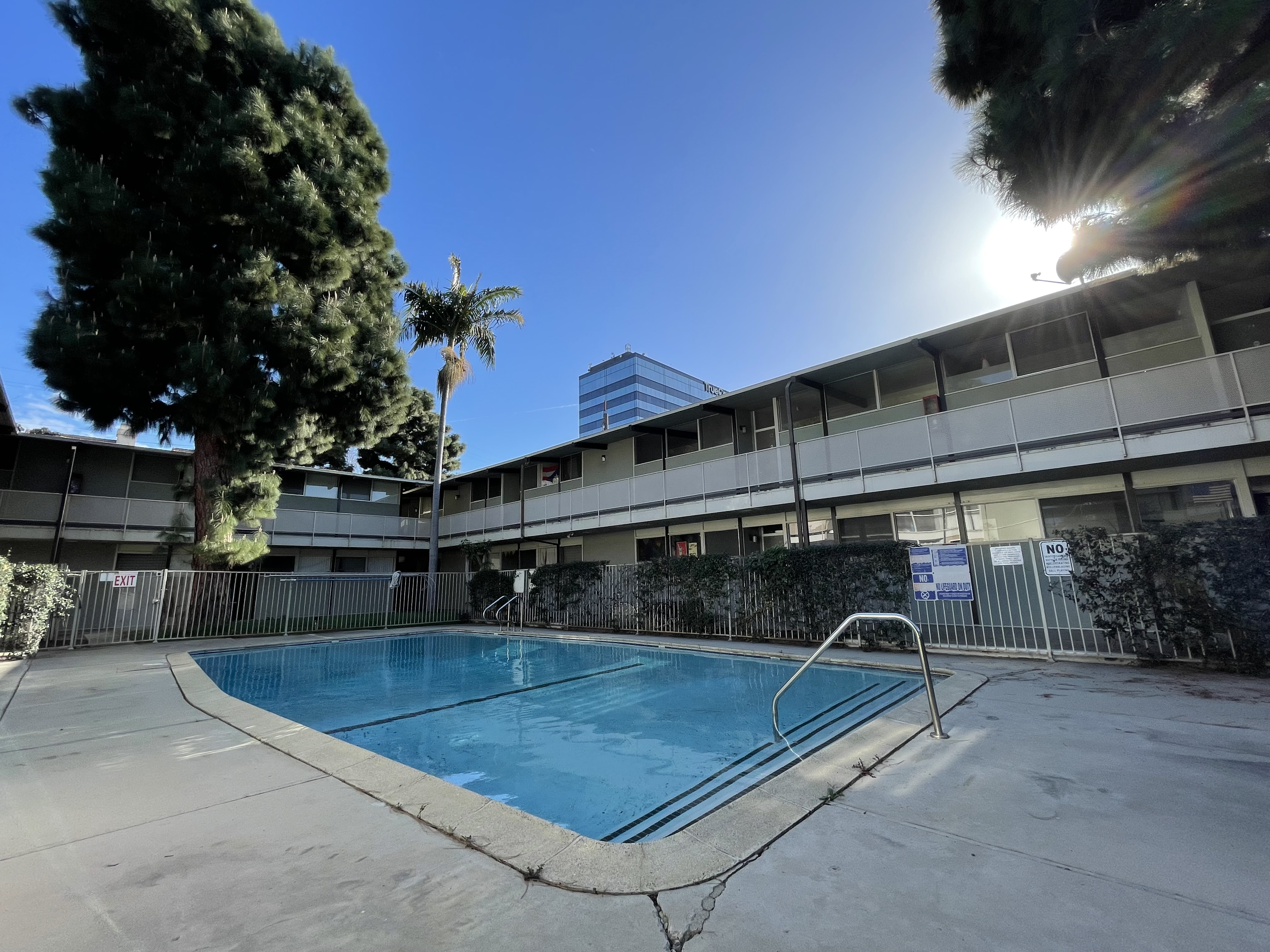
Sepulveda Rose Apartments, one of Dorman's early works exemplifying mid-century modern style

Richard Dorman (November 27, 1922 – April 3, 2010) was a mid-century modern architect known for his residential and commercial work in Southern California.

== Early life and education ==
Dorman was born and raised in Los Angeles. He joined the United States Army Air Forces on August 10, 1942. He rose to the rank of Captain in the Seventh Air Force, and flew numerous combat missions in the Pacific theater where he received the Distinguished Flying Cross, among other recognitions. He flew a B-24 Liberator called Tropic Knight.

He graduated from the University of Illinois in 1946, and then studied architecture at the University of Southern California on the GI Bill.

== Career ==
From 1951 to 1956, Dorman was assistant chief designer at Welton Becket and Associates; he then started his own firm in Beverly Hills, working primarily in Southern California. Initially he designed a number of industrial buildings; he became better known for his residential and commercial buildings and particularly for his use of post-and-beam construction. Instead of the normal three- or four-foot module, he often used a seven-foot module. He designed many houses for wealthy clients, including Beverly Garland's 1959 house in the Hollywood Hills and several in Trousdale Estates in Beverly Hills. His work embraces "total design", unifying landscape, exterior, and interior designs.

In 1968, Dorman's firm became Dorman-Munselle Associates. In the 1960s, he frequently lectured at California Polytechnic University. In 1975, he moved to Santa Fe, New Mexico, where he partnered with Larry Breen to form Dorman and Breen Architects.

== Awards ==
Dorman won AIA Awards of Merit for his Lakenan residence (1958) and Ivory Tower restaurant (1960) and AIA Honor Awards for his Beber restaurant (1963), Malibu United Methodist Church (1966) and Siedenbaum restaurant (1966). He is listed by the city of Beverly Hills as one of its "Master Architects". He won the competition to design a trade fair pavilion for the United States Department of Commerce in Thessaloniki, Greece.

He was one of 100 young Americans profiled in The Take-Over Generation, a 1962 special issue of Life; he was one of those depicted on the cover.

== Personal life ==
Dorman's first marriage was to Jean W. Cates; they had two sons and a daughter. After she died, he remarried to Barbara Kenyon in 2008.

Dorman also wrote thirteen books on narrow-gauge railroads. He had a 750-square-foot (70 m^{2}) model railroad layout in his home in Santa Fe.

== Selected works ==
- Papermate building, Santa Monica (1957)
- Lakenan residence (1958)
- Office building, Manila (1959)
- Sepulveda Rose apartment complex, Venice, Los Angeles (1959)
- Glazier house, Encino (1960)
- Ivory Tower restaurant, Santa Monica (1960, demolished)
- Stone Canyon residence, Bel Air (1961)
- Airport Office Building, Westchester (1961)
- Irving Stone residence, Beverly Hills (1961, demolished 2008)
- Sunset Loma Office Building, Los Angeles (1963)
- Beber Restaurant (1963)
- Los Angeles International Design Center, West Hollywood (1964)
- University of Southern California Married Student Housing, Los Angeles (1964)
- Lake Arrowhead Country Club, Lake Arrowhead (1964)
- Republic Federal Savings and Loan, Los Angeles (1965)
- Malibu United Methodist Church (1965)
- Siedenbaum Restaurant (1966)
- Control Data Corporation Office Building, Los Angeles (1967)
- Beverly Hills National Bank building, Brentwood (1969)
- Fairview Cottages, Palm Desert CA (1963)
