= Howard Lapham =

American modernist architect

- Born: Howard P. Lapham; May 11, 1914; Oklahoma City, Oklahoma, U.S.
- Died: April 16, 2008 (aged 93); Palm Springs, California, U.S.
- Occupations: Architect and building designer
- Years active: 1954–1980s
- Known for: Residential and commercial projects in the Coachella Valley, including Ichpa Mayapan, Desert Star Apartments, and the Chi Chi Club remodel
- Spouse: Rita Leeney (m. 1956; d. 2001)
- Children: 2

Howard P. Lapham (May 11, 1914 – April 16, 2008) was an American architectural designer active in the Coachella Valley of Southern California from the 1950s through the 1980s. He is recognized for residential commissions in Thunderbird Heights and other country club communities, commercial work in Palm Springs, and for the hillside Mayan Revival residence Ichpa Mayapan (Cook House) in Rancho Mirage.

== Early life and education ==
Lapham was born in Oklahoma City, Oklahoma, on May 11, 1914. Before moving to California he lived in Stamford, Connecticut, where he worked in building-related trades including carpentry, drafting, and contracting. He relocated to the Coachella Valley in 1954, to pursue opportunities in building and design.

== Career ==
Lapham was professionally active from the mid-1950s through the 1980s. Many of his early clients were associated with the Thunderbird Country Club in Rancho Mirage. Several of these houses, including the Hyatt Robert von Dehn, John Kiewit, Clarke Swanson, and Morrow residences, were featured in Architectural Digest in the early 1960s. He also contributed to a remodel of the Thunderbird Country Club clubhouse in 1961.

In Palm Springs, his commercial projects included a new façade for the Chi Chi Club in 1959, and involvement in the Palm Springs Greyhound Bus Terminal, completed the same year. He also designed the Desert Star Apartments in 1956, a small-scale hotel complex later recognized in 2016 as a Class 1 Historic Site by the Palm Springs City Council. Lapham also built a large residence at 650 East Tachevah Drive in 1966, which included high ceilings, a cantilevered roof, and terrazzo floors.

In Rancho Mirage, Lapham designed Lord Fletcher's English Pub (1966), a Tudor-style restaurant on Highway 111. His residential work there included Ichpa Mayapan (Cook House), a hillside house completed in 1970 with Mayan Revival influences.

From 1959 to 1963, Lapham collaborated with Romanian-born architect Haralamb H. Georgescu on several projects.

== Notable works ==
- Hyatt Robert von Dehn Residence (1960), Rancho Mirage
- Kiewit Residence (1960), Rancho Mirage
- Clarke Swanson Residence (1961), Rancho Mirage
- Morrow Residence (1961), Palm Desert
- Thunderbird Country Club clubhouse remodel (1961), Rancho Mirage
- Chi Chi Club façade renovation (1959), Palm Springs
- Greyhound Bus Terminal (1959), Palm Springs
- Desert Star Apartments (1956), Palm Springs
- Lord Fletcher's English Pub (1966), Rancho Mirage
- 650 East Tachevah Drive (1966), Palm Springs
- Ichpa Mayapan (Cook House) (1970), Rancho Mirage

== Personal life ==
Lapham married Rita Leeney in 1956, and they had two sons, Lawrence and Robert. He died in Palm Springs, California, on April 16, 2008, aged 93.

== Legacy ==
Lapham's designs have been documented in regional historic resource surveys and archives. Some of his buildings have been preserved, including the Desert Star Apartments, while others, such as the Hyatt von Dehn residence, have been demolished. The collection of his papers are held by the Palm Springs Art Museum. Local preservation organizations have highlighted his work, and several of his houses are featured during Modernism Week tours.

== See also ==
- Desert Modernism
- Palm Springs, California
- Thunderbird Country Club
