= Edward H. Fickett =

American architect

Edward Hale Fickett, FAIA, (May 19, 1916 – May 21, 1999, in Los Angeles) was an American architect who was a consultant to federal and local governments in the United States and to President Dwight D. Eisenhower.

== Biography ==
A fourth-generation Angeleno, Fickett was born May 19, 1916, in Los Angeles, California. He attended Beverly Hills High School and the University of Southern California. He also attended Art Center College of Design. Fickett was a draftsman under the architects Paul Williams, Sumner Spaulding, and Gordon B. Kaufman, architect of Santa Anita Park Racetrack.

Fickett served in the United States Navy Civil Engineer Corps Sea Bees. He was Assistant Officer in Charge of Construction Unit 26, Civil Engineer Corps which oversaw construction of Long Range Aids to Navigation Stations located in the South Pacific. In 1946, Fickett left the Navy as a lieutenant commander.

He graduated with a degree in Architectural from the University of Southern California. He also attended Art Center College of Design. He received a Master's Degree in both Architecture and Engineering from MIT.

Fickett was a Lieutenant Commander in the U.S. Navy in the Civil Engineering Corps known as the "Sea Bees". He was in charge of the Pacific Arena.

After World War II, Fickett was a partner in a private architectural firm located in Los Angeles with Francis Heusel and founded his own firm in 1944. He was admitted to corporate membership in the American Institute of Architects (AIA) on April 7, 1950. Shortly after that, he formulated and participated in the AIA's "University Lecture Series" bringing along colleagues, A. Quincy Jones, Rudolph Schindler, Richard Neutra, Frank Lloyd Wright, and Buckminster Fuller.

He was the Architectural Advisor to President Eisenhower and a consultant to the Federal Government on housing. The Federal Housing Administration sought out a seven-member panel, including Fickett, to study and make recommendations for revision of the Federal architectural code. This committee was known as the Architectural Standards Advisory Committee, FHA. Federal Housing Commissioner, Norman P. Mason declared in 1955, "A prime objective of the Architectural Standards Division to be the development of quality homes at low cost." In 1959, Fickett was appointed to the Federal Housing Advisory Board where rewrote the Minimum Property Requirements guide for builders. Many specifications and guidelines created during this period for the FHA are still being used today.

Fickett designed more than 60,000 post-war homes, along the way pioneering and promoting many of the concepts now seen as synonymous with California Modernism. Fickett was responsible for the planning and design of over seventy residential communities containing in excess of 40,000 single-family dwellings. Fourteen of these developments have been cited by the AIA, and NAHB along with numerous trade and professional magazines for their design excellence. Better Homes and Gardens declared Fickett, "The Frank LLoyd Wright of the 1950s".

During 1958, Fickett served in an advisory capacity to the National Association of Home Builders in the Research House Program. He contributed in bettering relations between home builders and architects in California while improving zoning and planning ordinances. Fickett served as the Chairman of the Southern California Chapter, AIA, Committee on Low-Cost Housing, collaborating with the Home Builders Association in planning a small prototype residential community in Los Angeles, California. He also served as a member of the American Arbitration Association, National Panel of Arbitrators for the years 1961, 1962, and 1963.

The American Institute of Architects honored Fickett on April 14, 1969, by inviting him for fellowship and membership into the College of Fellows for his notable contributions to the advancement of the profession of architecture (FAIA). It was through his excellence of design, proportion, and scale along with the regional materials used including redwood, adobe brick, and handmade flooring tiles. It was Fickett's ability to express the continuity of detail and expression of structural elements, all notable in the architect's works. The residential works exemplify an excellence of regional quality, which became the trademark of the architect.

The City of Los Angeles Cultural Affairs Department designated the Jacobson House, Los Angeles as Historic Cultural Monument No. 674. This was the first contemporary structure to receive Landmark Status from the City. Commissioned by Dr. and Mrs. George Jacobson in 1965. The Jacobson House embodies the distinguishing characteristics of Fickett's work. Located on the same hillside street as the landmark Lovell Health House, the Jacobson House overlooks Eastern Hollywood and Barnsdall Park. Fickett oriented the house to make maximum use of the broad panorama. The house is a pavilion with the interior extending into the exterior with Asian-inspired landscaping. Other "Fickett Details" in the house include custom-designed light fixtures, clerestory windows, room partitions, walnut paneling, built-in amenities such as bar and music storage, aggregate stone paving, large wrap-around decks, doors framed with painted black surrounds, and a variety of building materials, in this case, brick, wood, stone, and glass. His fascination with light is quite apparent in the architect's body of work. Filtered and diffused light is often found with slatted shade screens, "peek-a-boo" windows, clerestory windows, and interior atrium positioned to allow soft light into areas of the home. Fickett felt every window had a purpose; to bring the outside in.

Upon his death in 1999 due to complications from an E. coli infection, the American Institute of Architects named him "An American Hero". Governor Gray Davis praised him as "an exceptional architect who made many beautiful contributions to his community and to the people of this great state." President Bill Clinton presented his widow, Joycie Fickett with a letter of condolence, along with an American flag.

== Notable works ==
Some of his notable designs include La Costa Resort near San Diego, Edwards Air Force Base, the Naval Air Station at Los Alamitos, California, Murphy Canyon Heights Naval Base in San Diego, La Jolla Fashion Center, the Bistro Gardens restaurant in Beverly Hills, Spago Restaurant in West Hollywood, Scandia Restaurant, Nick's Fish Market Restaurant, Olie Hammond's Restaurant in Los Angeles, the Port of Los Angeles Passenger and Cargo Terminals, the historic and seismic renovation of the Los Angeles City Hall Tower (Phase I), the new extension of the Nethercutt Antique Car Museum, the Los Angeles Police Academy, Dodger Stadium, Mammoth Mountain Inn, Las Cruces Resort, Hotel Cabo San Lucas, Hotel Hacienda, and various commercial developments.

A proponent of pre-fabricated design and affordable housing, Fickett is perhaps best known for the more than 60,000 homes of his design, known as “Fickett Houses.” He was also known as the "Architect to the Stars", having designed magnificent estates for the Hollywood glitterati. He was also nicknamed the King of the Tennis Courts, having been the first architect to design cantilever tennis courts.

== Sources ==
- "An American Hero", AIArchitect, October 1999 - Volume 6.
- "Edward H. Fickett; Award- Winning Architect Built Showplaces", Los Angeles Times, June 19, 1999.
- Martha Groves (March 29, 2010). "USC to get papers of Modernist architecture's unsung hero", Los Angeles Times.
- American architects directory, American Institute of Architects, 1962, 1970 editions, English Serial Publication v. 29 cm. New York, R.R. Bowker Co.
- Rapaport, Richard (2014). California Moderne and the Mid-Century Dream: The Architecture of Edward H. Fickett. New York: Rizzoli. ISBN 978-0-8478-4248-3.
- https://larchmontchronicle.com/fickett-built-palatial-homes-everyone/
