= Harold Levitt =

American architect

- Born: July 26, 1921; San Francisco, California
- Died: April 24, 2003 (aged 81); Las Vegas, Nevada
- Education: Stanford University; University of Southern California
- Occupation: Architect
- Spouse: Jane Spalding
- Children: Lansford Levitt

Harold Levitt (1921–2003) was an American architect.

== Early life ==
Harold Warren Levitt was born on July 26, 1921, in San Francisco, California. He received a Bachelor of Arts in Graphic Arts from Stanford University and an architecture degree from the University of Southern California.

== Career ==
He worked for Roland Coate and Burton Schutt before he founded his own architectural company, Levitt, LeDuc & Farwell, in the 1950s. The company was headquartered in Beverly Hills, California. He designed homes for Walter Mirisch, Steven Spielberg, Lew Wasserman, Olivia Newton-John, Ross Hunter, Quincy Jones, Burt Lancaster, Dean Martin, Debbie Reynolds, Lionel Richie, Kenny Rogers and Hal Wallis. He also designed the Riviera Hotel on the Las Vegas Strip and the headquarters of the Academy of Motion Picture Arts and Sciences in Beverly Hills.

== Personal life ==
He was married to Jane (Spalding) Levitt for fifty-eight years, and they had a son, Lansford. He retired to Reno, Nevada, in 2001.

== Death ==
He died at his holiday home in Las Vegas, Nevada, in 2003.
