= William Francis Cody =

American architect (1916–1978)

- Born: June 19, 1916; Dayton, Ohio, U.S.
- Died: August 29, 1978 (aged 62); Palm Springs, California, U.S.
- Education: University of Southern California
- Occupation: Architect

William Francis Cody (1916 – 1978) was an influential desert modern architect working in Palm Springs during the peak of the Modern Architecture Movement. Like many of the architects during the mid-20th century, Cody designed almost anything Palm Springs allowed him to; houses, cluster housing, churches, offices, restaurants, schools, hotels, and club houses. His residential projects illustrated simplicity of form, natural light, and large windows displaying a smooth connection between interior and exterior. Cody maintained a diverse practice in the Coachella Valley of California. His work included designing country clubs, residences, hotels, a library, and church projects in Palm Springs, Indian Wells, Rancho Mirage, Palm Desert, and in southern California, Arizona, Mexico, and Cuba.

== Early years and education ==
William Francis Cody was born on June 19, 1916, in Dayton, Ohio, to William F. Cody, Sr. and Anna Elizabeth Shadle. His father owned a haberdashery while his mother worked as an interior designer. It was Anna's passion for art and architecture that influenced both William and his brother John. By 1930, the Cody family relocated to California where Cody was educated, married, and built his career.

Cody designed and built stage sets for school plays alongside the son of Jack L. Warner while attending Beverly Hills High School; graduating in April 1932. Cody attended Santa Monica Junior College, graduating in 1939, and in 1940 he enrolled in the College of Architecture and Fine Arts at the University of Southern California; graduating with his degree in Architecture in 1942.

== Work experience ==
While attending Santa Monica Junior College, Cody worked for architects Heath Warton and Asa Hudson. In 1943, Cody worked for an Oakland-based engineering firm on a Kaiser Steel, a.k.a. Kaiser Ventures, plant in Fontana, California. During this year he also worked for the San Francisco firm of Blanchard, Maher, and Ward on Navy installations on Treasure Island. In 1944, he worked primarily on National Design Award- winning elementary and high school buildings in California and Arizona for Marsh, Smith, and Powell in Los Angeles. It was also in 1944 that Cody worked for Cliff May, a leading southern California building designer, on May's influential Pace-Setter House. In 1945, Cody was retained to alter the Desert Inn in Palm Springs. By 1946, Cody was licensed to practice architecture in California and Arizona, and in 1946 Cody received his first independent commission for completing the Del Marcos Hotel, winning him a "creditable mention" award in 1949 by the southern California chapter of the American Institute of Architects.

Cody capitalized on Palm Springs becoming a retreat for the rich and famous by moving his practice there. In 1950, he was retained to convert the Thunderbird Dude Ranch into the Thunderbird Country Club. This successful conversion led to Cody being commissioned to design or alter clubhouses, recreational facilities, and residential developments at Eldorado Country Club, Tamarisk Country Club, the Racquet Club, the Tennis Club and the Seven Lakes Clubhouse. Cody began, nearly a decade of work, altering and expanding upon the Palm Springs Country Spa Hotel in 1960. Cody's specialization in country club clubhouses along with associated residential developments led to his being commissioned in California, Arizona, Texas, Cuba, and Mexico.

Cody's latest commissions of note are located in Palm Springs: St. Theresa Catholic Church and Convent, and buildings for the Palm Springs Planning Collaborative including the Palm Springs Library.

=== Work with Robert P. McCulloch ===
When Robert P. McCulloch founded Lake Havasu City, Arizona, Cody designed, expanded upon, and altered McCulloch Corporation's chainsaw plant there. He went on to design residential developments in Lake Havasu City and Fountain Hills in Scottsdale. He also designed an Eldorado tract in Indian Wells, California. Finally, Cody designed a corporate complex for McCulloch near LAX as well as making alterations to a house at Thunderbird Country Club for McCulloch and his wife.

== American Institute of Architects membership ==
Cody became a member of the American Institute of Architects in 1948, being elevated to Fellowship within the organization in 1965. The following projects are cited on his nomination for Achievements in Architectural Design:

- William Francis Cody Residence (Palm Springs, Ca)
- Del Marcos Hotel (Palm Springs, Ca)
- Levin Residence (Palm Springs, Ca)
- Haines Office Building (Beverly Hills, Ca)
- Mission Valley Country Club (San Diego, Ca)
- Jorgensen Residence (Palm Springs, Ca)
- Springs Restaurant (Palm Springs, Ca)
- Eldorado Country Club (Palm Springs, Ca)
- Spa Bathhouse (Palm Springs, Ca)
- Clare Residence (Palm Springs, Ca)
- Nicoletti Residence (Palm Springs, Ca)
- Palo Alto Hills Country Club (Palo Alto, Ca)
- Roundhill Country Club (Alamo, Ca)
- Sloane Residence (La Quinta, Ca)
- Western Savings & Loan (Tempe, Az)
- Randall Residence (Palm Desert, Ca)
- Driggs Residence (Phoenix, Az)
- Spa Bathhouse-Hotel (Palm Springs, Ca)
- Abernathy Residence (Palm Springs, Ca)
- Shamel Residence (Palm Springs, Ca)
- Western Savings & Loan (Phoenix, Az)
