= Hugh M. Kaptur =

American architect

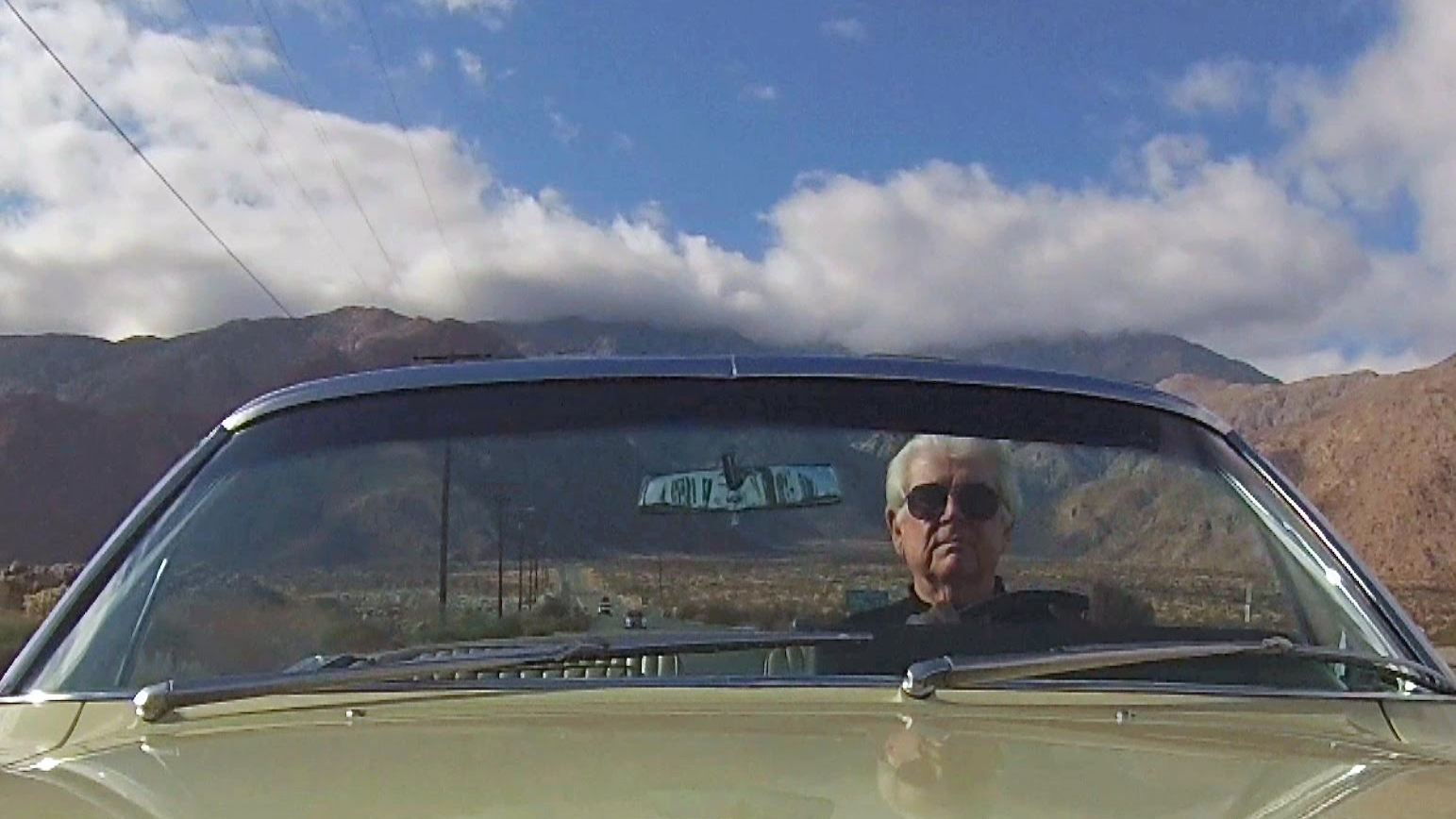
- Kaptur in 2013
- Born: May 22, 1931 (aged 94); Detroit, Michigan, U.S.
- Occupation: Architect
- Spouse: Helen Dzo Dzo (d. 2015)
- Children: 3

Hugh Michael Kaptur (born May 22, 1931) is an American architect whose practice is primarily in California's Coachella Valley. During his fifty years as an architect, Kaptur has designed residential homes, apartment complexes, civic buildings, including two of Palm Springs' fire stations, commercial office buildings and hotels.

== Design career ==
The bulk of his work is in the Mid-Century modern style. He is considered a contemporary of William Cody, Donald Wexler, Richard Harrison and Howard Lapham. He was born in Michigan, where his father was a designer in the Packard and GM studios. After his honorable discharge from the Marines, he moved to Palm Springs in 1956 where he apprenticed in the offices of Wexler and Harrison. After being laid off, Kaptur went on his own and designed several model homes for the Ranch Construction Company. In 1962, he formed a partnership with licensed architect Robert Ricciardi so that he could get the commission for Palm Springs Fire Station #3. After that partnership broke up, in 1965 he formed a company with Larry Lapham, noted architect Howard Lapham's son which was to last ten years. His last partnership was with James Cioffi, after which he semi-retired in 1992. Kaptur designed several notable residences, including those for Steve McQueen and William Holden; municipal buildings – Fire Station #3 and #4 in Palm Springs; The Deauville with a porte cochere entry, apartment buildings – the Caballeros complex; and numerous commercial hotels and office buildings.

Kaptur had a Golden Palm Star dedicated to him on the Palm Springs Walk of Stars on February 14, 2014. He is featured in a documentary film, Quiet Elegance, that was released at Modernism Week 2014 in Palm Springs.
