= List of Honorees of the Palm Springs Walk of the Stars =

Honorees of the Palm Springs Walk of Stars

The following list includes the names, locations, and categories of all the honorees of the Palm Springs Walk of the Stars. The categories are Architect/Artist/Designer, Athlete, Civic/Pioneer, Entertainment, Humanitarian, Literary and Military. The list does not include an honoree's name until their ceremony has taken place, rather than at the time of nomination or acceptance of the nomination.

The honorees are ordered alphabetically and grouped by category, and all names are shown as they appear on the stars. More information about the award categories and criteria can be found on the Palm Springs Walk of the Stars website.

The first class of entries was in 1992, and all entries can be found on the Palm Springs Walk of the Stars website. As of November 20, 2025, there are 483 stars on the Palm Springs Walk of Stars.

== Architect/Artist/Designer ==
Name	Description	Address	Date
Alexander family	Builders (Construction)	300 S. Palm Canyon Dr.	February 13, 2020
Karen Barone (Note: Karen and Tony Barone share a star)	Artists	Downtown Palm Springs Park	July 14, 2025
Tony Barone	Artists	Downtown Palm Springs Park	July 14, 2025
Pierre Cardin (Note: Nominee is member of the LGBTQ+ Community)	Fashion designer	101 N. Palm Canyon Dr.	February 20, 2020
Jacques Caussin	Designer	300 S. Palm Canyon Dr.	February 14, 2024
Michael Childers	Photographer	101 Museum Dr.	March 16, 2008
William Francis Cody	Architect	300 S. Palm Canyon Dr.	February 17, 2012
Michael Costello (Note: Listed in the Entertainment category)	Fashion designer	115 S. Palm Canyon Dr.	March 20, 2017
Arthur Elrod	Designer	300 S. Palm Canyon Dr.	February 15, 2019
Albert Frey	Architect	300 S. Palm Canyon Dr.	February 12, 2010
R. C. Gorman	Native American artist	193 S. Palm Canyon Dr.	February 16, 2002
Richard A. Harrison	Architect	300 S. Palm Canyon Dr.	February 12, 2016
Dan "JR-PR" Hatchett Bohlmann (Note: Dan “JR-PR” and Sharie Hatchett Bohlmann share a star)	Lawyer	214 S. Palm Canyon Dr.	December 2, 2007
Sharie Hatchett Bohlmann	Artist	214 S. Palm Canyon Dr.	December 2, 2007
Herbert W. Burns	Architect	300 S. Palm Canyon Dr.	October 17, 2025
Robert Imber	Architect	300 S. Palm Canyon Dr.	October 22, 2016
A. Quincy Jones	Architect	300 S. Palm Canyon Dr.	February 15, 2013
Ray Kaiser	Artist and designer	265 S. Palm Canyon Dr.	April 15, 2000
Hugh M. Kaptur	Architect	300 S. Palm Canyon Dr.	February 14, 2014
William Krisel	Architect	300 S. Palm Canyon Dr.	February 12, 2009
John Edward Lautner	Architect	300 S. Palm Canyon Dr.	February 17, 2017
Richard Neutra	Architect	300 S. Palm Canyon Dr.	February 13, 2015
Craig Prater	Executive Director, Palm Springs International Film Festival	Downtown Palm Springs Park	January 5, 2023
Julius Shulman	Photographer	300 S. Palm Canyon Dr.	February 17, 2006
William Charles Tanner	Artists and architectural designer	300 S. Palm Canyon Dr.	February 24, 2023
Ed Thrasher	Photographer and art director	160 S. Palm Canyon Dr.	May 10, 2007
Donald Wexler	Architect	300 S. Palm Canyon Dr.	February 15, 2008
E. Stewart Williams	Architect	300 S. Palm Canyon Dr.	February 16, 2007
Paul R. Williams	Architect	300 S. Palm Canyon Dr.	February 16, 2018

== Athlete ==
Name	Description	Address	Date
Timothy Ray Bradley Jr.	WBO and WBC boxing champion	110 N. Palm Canyon Dr.	December 6, 2014
Michael Bush	2007 NFL draft professional football player	205 S. Palm Canyon Dr.	November 9, 2021
Raymond Moore	Tennis player and ATP Tour developer	265 S. Palm Canyon Dr.	March 11, 2004
Arnold Palmer	Golfer and restaurateur	415 S. Palm Canyon Dr.	January 16, 2017
Ken Venturi (Note: No category indicated)	Golfer	161 Waterford Circle	May 15, 2004
Sidney Williams	Former American diplomat and NFL player	300 S. Palm Canyon Dr.	October 20, 2017

== Civic/Pioneer ==
Name	Description	Address	Date
Tony Aguilar, Jr.	Civic leader and creator of the Greater Palm Springs Celebrity Golf Classic	360 N. Palm Canyon Dr.	November 13, 2015
Karyn Barnes	Community leader	198 S. Palm Canyon Dr.	December 7, 2002
John Bianchi	Manufacturer of leather goods, and National Guard Major General	223 S. Palm Canyon Dr.	April 12, 1997
Frank Bogert	Cowboy, professional rodeo announcer, author, and politician	219 S. Palm Canyon Dr.	May 30, 1997
Jim Casey	Businessman	100 S. Palm Canyon Dr.	December 10, 2011
Joseph Chiriaco (Note: Ruth and Joseph Chiriaco Peet share a star)	Entrepreneurs and philanthropists	144 S. Palm Canyon Dr.	March 3, 2015
Ruth Chiriaco	Entrepreneurs and philanthropists	144 S. Palm Canyon Dr.	March 3, 2015
Elizabeth Coffman Kiely	President, Palm Springs Historical Society	219 S. Palm Canyon Dr.	November 2, 1997
Harry L. Coffman, M.D.	First doctor in Palm Springs	101 N. Palm Canyon Dr.	April 27, 1995
Nellie Coffman	Community pioneer, opened Desert Inn Sanatorium with husband Harry	101 N Palm Canyon Dr.	November 18, 1994
Aftab Dada	Businessman and philanthropists	256 S. Palm Canyon Dr.	March 27, 2014
Jo Ann Davis (Note: Larry and Jo Ann Davis share a star)	Civic leaders	100 S. Palm Canyon Dr.	December 18, 2013
Larry Davis	Civic leaders	100 S. Palm Canyon Dr.	December 18, 2013
Florencio Delgado (Note: Martha and Florencio Delgado share a star)	Restauranteurs	222 S. Palm Canyon Dr.	October 23, 2006
Martha Delgado	Restauranteurs	222 S. Palm Canyon Dr.	October 23, 2006
Richard DeSantis	Event producer	Downtown Palm Springs Park	October 11, 2022
Dr. Borko B. Djordjevic	Plastic surgeon	193 S. Palm Canyon Dr.	December 7, 2001
Martha Mae Edgmon	Public servant	121 S. Palm Canyon Dr.	March 20, 2015
Brian Ellis	Restauranteur	100 S. Palm Canyon Dr.	April 17, 2024
Dr. Frank Ercoli	Doctor, Desert Regional Medical Center	120 N. Palm Canyon Dr.	November 12, 2021
Bill Feingold	Columnist	255 S. Palm Canyon Dr.	October 14, 2019
Barbara Foster	Civic leader and spouse of Mayor Bill Foster	223 S. Palm Canyon Dr.	May 9, 2015
Jack Freeman	Businessman	123 N. Palm Canyon Dr.	July 11, 1997
Earl Greenburg (Note: Earl Greenburg and David Peet share a star)	Producer and head of NBC Daytime	155 S. Palm Canyon Dr.	March 30, 2007
Gloria Greene	Humanitarian	435 N. Palm Canyon Dr.	May 29, 1999
Tim Hanlon	President of Wells Fargo Foundation and Executive VP of Wells Fargo	200 S. Palm Canyon Dr.	January 5, 2015
Sherman Harris	Restauranteur and community leader	La Plaza Court	October 24, 1998
Ethel Harutun	Restauranteur	187 S. Palm Canyon Dr.	October 23, 2002
Joe Henderson (Note: Joe and Moya Henderson share a star)	Businessman	219 S. Palm Canyon Dr.	November 4, 2006
Moya Henderson	Columnist	219 S. Palm Canyon Dr.	November 4, 2006
Deyna Lee Hodges	Politician	100 S. Palm Canyon Dr.	October 8, 2005
Mark Hunter Seymour	Founder, Hunters Nightclubs	302 E Arenas Rd.	November 7, 2025
Milt Jones	Publisher, Palm Springs Life	155 S. Palm Canyon Dr.	October 24, 2003
Josh Joseph (Note: Josh and Joan Joseph share a star)	Creators, Jazz Appreciation Music Society	100 Museum Dr.	February 29, 2000
Joan Joseph	Creators, Jazz Appreciation Music Society	100 Museum Dr.	February 29, 2000
Jerry Keller	Restauranteur	200 S. Palm Canyon Dr.	May 23, 2023
S. Duke Kosslyn	Community leader	La Plaza Court	November 6, 1998
Al Lerner	Banker and philanthropist	123 N. Palm Canyon Dr.	February 15, 1997
Ruth Licata	Community leader	222 S. Palm Canyon Dr.	March 24, 2006
Fred Markham (Note: Fred and Maziebelle Markham share a star)	Owner, Smoke Tree Ranch	219 S. Palm Canyon Dr.	November 16, 2002
Maziebelle Markham	Owner, Smoke Tree Ranch	219 S. Palm Canyon Dr.	November 16, 2002
Harold Matzner	Resturanteur, humanitarian and philanthropist	155 S. Palm Canyon Dr.	April 1, 2006
John McDonald (Note: John McDonald and Rob Wright share a star)	Philanthropists	1301 N. Palm Canyon Dr.	November 8, 2019
Pearl McCallum McManus	Pioneer and community developer	219 S. Palm Canyon Dr.	April 21, 1999
Richard Milanovich	Chairman of the Agua Caliente Band	219 S. Palm Canyon Dr.	April 17, 1998
John Miller	Businessman	219 S. Palm Canyon Dr.	July 25, 1997
Chester Moorten	Desert landscape garden designers, established the Moorten Botanical Garden and Cactarium	219 S. Palm Canyon Dr.	November 15, 1999
Patricia Moorten	Desert landscape garden designers, established the Moorten Botanical Garden and Cactarium	219 S. Palm Canyon Dr.	November 15, 1999
Ron Oden	Mayor of Palm Springs	121 S. Palm Canyon Dr.	December 16, 2007
Charlie Pasarell	Tennis player and administrator, founder of the Indian Wells Tennis Tournament	155 S. Palm Canyon Dr.	March 10, 2001
Flora Agnes Patencio	Cahuilla Indian elder	219 S. Palm Canyon Dr.	April 8, 1996
Ray Leonard Patencio	Cahuilla Indian leader	400 E. Tahquitz Canyon Way	March 15, 2006
David Peet	Public relations consultant	155 S. Palm Canyon Dr.	March 30, 2007
Zachary Pitts	Real estate developer	La Plaza Court	November 30, 1998
Refugio "Cuco" Salazar	Community pioneer	219 S. Palm Canyon Dr.	January 17, 2004
Karen Sausman	CEO, Living Desert Zoo and Gardens	538 N. Palm Canyon Dr.	February 18, 2009
Alexandra Sheldon	President, Bighorn Institute	100 Museum Dr.	November 16, 1996
Jessica Simmons	Fashion designer and civic leader	152 N. Palm Canyon Dr.	December 4, 1998
Frederick Sleight	Executive Director, Palm Springs Art Museum	100 Museum Dr.	April 7, 2000
Arthur Smith	Unknown	223 S. Palm Canyon Dr.	March 24, 1998
Mary Sorrentino	Restauranteur	160 S. Palm Canyon Dr.	January 25, 2001
Burt Spivack	Civic leader	140 N. Palm Canyon Dr.	May 24, 2024
Susan Stein	Public relations director	Downtown Palm Springs Park	January 30, 2024
Marjorie F. Stephens	Unknown	219 S. Palm Canyon Dr.	November 10, 1999
Earle C. Strebe	Businessman, owner of the Plaza Theatre, *one of inaugural recipients	128 S. Palm Canyon Dr.	February 26, 1992
Judith Sumich	City clerk and community leader	219 S. Palm Canyon Dr.	November 16, 1999
Dr. Charles “Chuck” Supple	Doctor to the stars	538 N. Palm Canyon Dr.	December 6, 2024
Bobby Thomas	Businessman	235 S. Palm Canyon Dr.	December 11, 2007
Dr. Thomas Truhe	Dentist	100 Museum Dr.	November 16, 2014
John W. Williams	Realtor	223 S. Palm Canyon Dr.	January 22, 2000
Rob Wright	Philanthropists	1301 N. Palm Canyon Dr.	November 8, 2019

== Entertainment ==
Name	Description	Address	Date
Chris Alcaide	Actor	100 S. Palm Canyon Dr.	January 27, 1995
Bill Alexander	Musician and real estate developer	255 S. Palm Canyon Dr.	February 16, 2001
George Allardice	Singer	190 S. Palm Canyon Dr.	April 12, 2000
Mike “Santa” Allen	Santa Claus	235 S. Palm Canyon Dr.	November 24, 2007
Lezlie Anders (Note: Buddy Greco and Lezlie Anders share a star)	Singer and pianist	538 N. Palm Canyon Dr.	February 13, 2008
Richard Anderson	Actor	205 S. Palm Canyon Dr.	October 22, 2007
Dane Andrew	Actor, producer, cinematographer	200 S. Palm Canyon Dr.	May 5, 2007
Vic Armstrong	Director, stunt coordinator, stunt double	264 S. Palm Canyon Dr.	December 14, 2005
William Asher	Producer, director, screenwriter	100 N. Palm Canyon Dr.	November 22, 2003
William F. "Bill" Austin	Businessman and philanthropist	128 S. Palm Canyon Dr.	February 25, 2005
Lauren Bacall	Actress	135 E. Tahquitz Canyon Way	January 10, 1997
Ted Bacino	Director	156 N. Palm Canyon Dr.	November 25, 2005
Carroll Baker	Actress	100 Museum Dr.	May 4, 2001
Kaye Ballard	Actress, comedian, and singer	101 S. Palm Canyon Dr	November 18, 1995
Jeannette Banoczi	Musician, radio station owner	265 S. Palm Canyon Dr.	February 19, 2000
Dino C. Barbis	Music industry executive	333 N. Palm Canyon Dr.	April 21, 2001
Malcolm Barbour	Producer	150 N. Palm Canyon Dr.	May 24, 2003
Glen Barnett (Note: Glen and Opal Barnett share a star)	Unknown	205 S. Palm Canyon Dr.	October 4, 1999
Opal Barnett	Owner, KWXY	205 S. Palm Canyon Dr.	October 4, 1999
Rona Barrett	Gossip columnist and businesswoman	111 S. Palm Canyon Dr.	October 9, 2009
Gene Barry	Actor and singer	123 N. Palm Canyon Dr.	March 19, 1994
Chris Baugh	Film location manager	210 S. Palm Canyon Dr.	April 10, 2002
Ralph Bellamy	Actor, *one of inaugural recipients	123 N. Palm Canyon Dr.	February 26, 1992
Roberto Benigni	Actor, comedian, screenwriter, and director	135 E. Tahquitz Canyon Way	January 9, 1999
Jonathan Bennett	Actor, Producer, Host	100 S Palm Canyon Dr.	November 20, 2025
Richard Blackwell aka Mr. Blackwell	Fashion critic, journalist, television and radio personality, artist, actor, fashion designer	123 N. Palm Canyon Dr.	January 11, 1997
Hal Blaine	Musician	100 S. Palm Canyon Dr.	February 6, 2023
Annette Bloch	Philanthropist and author	110 N. Palm Canyon Dr.	February 7, 2013
Cliff Bole	Director	255 S. Palm Canyon Dr.	April 4, 2005
Ray Bolger	Actor, dancer, singer	132 S. Palm Canyon Dr.	January 10, 1998
Lauri Bono (Note: Kal David and Lauri Bono share a star)	Singer and songwriter	120 S. Palm Canyon Dr.	December 5, 2004
Sonny Bono	Comedian, singer, actor, former mayor, and congressman	101 N Palm Canyon Dr.	May 18, 1996
Ernest Borgnine	Actor	265 S. Palm Canyon Dr.	January 17, 1998
Gerry Bucci	Actor	265 S. Palm Canyon Dr.	February 16, 2007
Joyce Bulifant (Note: Joyce Bulifant and Roger Perry share a star)	Actress and author	110 N. Palm Canyon Dr.	November 29, 2014
Patricia Carr-Bosley	Actress	155 S. Palm Canyon Dr.	February 17, 2001
Lynda Carter	Actress, singer, and beauty pageant contestant	515 N. Palm Canyon Dr.	May 10, 2014
Pattie Daly Caruso	Actress, writer, producer, philanthropist and TV host	265 S. Palm Canyon Dr.	March 25, 2005
Lon Chaney Jr.	Actor	275 S. Palm Canyon Dr.	January 11, 1999
Carol Channing	Actress, comedian, singer and dancer	369 N. Palm Canyon Dr.	October 2, 2010
Betty Chapman Francis	Columnist	112 N. Palm Canyon Dr.	April 24, 2014
Chevy Chase	Comedian, actor, and writer	110 S. Palm Canyon Dr.	December 11, 1998
Cheeta, the Chimp	Chimpanzee character from the Tarzan films and TV series	110 S. Palm Canyon Dr.	March 31, 1995
Linda Christian	Actress	193 S. Palm Canyon Dr.	December 28, 2001
Eddie Cinque	Bar owner and community activist	538 N. Palm Canyon Dr.	November 14, 2013
Shirley Claire	Singer and dancer	128 S. Palm Canyon Dr.	May 6, 2019
Iron Eyes Cody	Actor	255 S. Palm Canyon Dr.	January 15, 1999
Susie Coelho	TV personality, author, and businesswoman	145 S. Palm Canyon Dr.	February 28, 2025
Nathan Cohen	Owner, Oasis Plaza	101 S. Palm Canyon Dr.	October 20, 2000
Carol Connors	Singer	265 S. Palm Canyon Dr.	January 16, 1999
John Conte	Actor and Television Station Owner	100 Museum Dr.	December 13, 1997
Carole Cook	Actress	100 S. Palm Canyon Dr.	April 1, 2019
Pierre Cossette	Producer	255 S. Palm Canyon Dr.	January 14, 2006
Mike Costley	Singer and performer	100 Museum Dr.	May 6, 2002
Patrick Curtis	Producer	211 S. Palm Canyon Dr.	October 18, 1997
Jorja Curtright	Actress and interior designer	275 S. Palm Canyon Dr.	February 27, 1999
Keisha D	Singer	193 S. Palm Canyon Dr.	January 17, 2020
Dorothy Kloss	Dancer	128 S. Palm Canyon Dr.	May 29, 2010
Darci Daniels	Singer	360 N. Palm Canyon Dr.	October 31, 2014
Michael Dante	Actor and minor league baseball player	112 N. Palm Canyon Dr.	June 19, 1994
Anne D'Aubery Batte	Actress	100 Museum Dr.	January 24, 1998
Kal David	Blues guitarist	120 S. Palm Canyon Dr.	December 5, 2004
Beryl Davis	Singer	123 N. Palm Canyon Dr.	December 12, 1996
Velma Wayne Dawson	Puppet maker and puppeteer	100 Museum Dr.	November 17, 2000
Hendrick De Boer	Singer and actor	265 S. Palm Canyon Dr.	March 24, 2000
Rudy de la Mor	Musician	369 N. Palm Canyon Dr.	June 9, 2013
Eddie Dean	Singer and actor	255 S. Palm Canyon Dr.	March 20, 1999
Lou DeGrado	Actor and dancer	285 S. Palm Canyon Dr.	February 11, 2006
Patty Delgado Elliott	Restauranteur	222 S. Palm Canyon Dr.	September 17, 2011
William "Bill" Demarest	Actor	123 S. Palm Canyon Dr.	April 9, 1998
Catherine Deneuve	Actress	155 S. Palm Canyon Dr.	January 18, 2000
Richard Di Bona	Inventor	369 N. Palm Canyon Dr.	October 26, 1997
Kem Dibbs	Actor	100 N. Palm Canyon Dr.	April 1, 1994
Marlene Dietrich	Singer and actress	101 S. Palm Canyon Dr	November 8, 1996
Phyllis Diller	Comedian, actress, author, musician, and visual artist	123 N. Palm Canyon Dr.	March 8, 2001
Yolande Donlan (Note: Val Guest and Yolande Donlan share a star)	Actress	265 S. Palm Canyon Dr.	April 3, 2004
Morton Downey Jr.	Talk show host and actor	101 S. Palm Canyon Dr.	October 10, 1998
Tom Dreesen	Actor and stand-up comedian.	265 S. Palm Canyon Dr.	February 18, 1999
Ellen Drew	Actress	123 N. Palm Canyon Dr.	November 22, 1997
Les Dames du Soleil	Fundraising drag duo	186 S. Palm Canyon Dr.	October 6, 2007
Denise DuBarry	Actress, businesswoman, film producer, and philanthropist	301 N. Palm Canyon Dr.	May 10, 2002
Betsy Duncan Hammes	Singer	123 N. Palm Canyon Dr	October 25, 1996
George "Bullets" Durgom	Actor	123 N. Palm Canyon Dr.	February 17, 1995
Fleet Easton	Musician	369 N. Palm Canyon Dr.	December 9, 2016
Craig Eaton	Unknown	101 S. Palm Canyon Dr.	March 14, 2005
Gale Enger (Note: Listed in the Civic/Pioneer category)	Musician	160 S. Palm Canyon Dr.	November 20, 2000
Joey English	Singer and actor	301 N. Palm Canyon Dr.	November 17, 2000
Wesley Eure	Actor, singer, author, producer, director, and educator	160 S. Palm Canyon Dr.	May 6, 2007
Dale Evans (Note: Roy Rogers and Dale Evans share a star)	Actress, singer, and songwriter	100 Museum Dr.	May 5, 2001
Patrick Evans	Meteorologist and businessman	114 N. Palm Canyon Dr.	April 4, 2014
Sonny Evaro and Family	Performing family	285 N. Palm Canyon Dr.	November 28, 2005
The Layne Family	Founders of the Palm Canyon Theatre	538 N. Palm Canyon Dr.	March 13, 2015
Sim Farrar	Chair, U.S. Advisory Commission on Public Diplomacy	262 S. Palm Canyon Dr.	June 17, 2006
Charlie Farrell	Actor, *one of inaugural recipients	142 S. Palm Canyon Dr.	February 26, 1992
Alice Faye	Singer and actress	123 N. Palm Canyon Dr.	June 24, 1994
Andrew J. Fenady	Producer and writer	245 S. Palm Canyon Dr.	December 7, 1996
Frank Ferrante	Actor, comedian and director	125 S. Palm Canyon Dr.	October 19, 2021
Ernie Flatt	Choreographer and dancer	123 N. Palm Canyon Dr	November 25, 1995
Susan Fleming Marx (Note: Star was moved and rededicated. Original location was 123 N Palm Canyon Drive on February 20, 1998)	Actress	265 S. Palm Canyon Dr.	March 23, 2002
Rhonda Fleming	Actress and singer	200 S. Palm Canyon Dr.	December 9, 2007
Peter Fonda	Actor, film director, and screenwriter	301 N. Palm Canyon Dr.	October 22, 2000
Phil Ford (Note: Phil Ford and Mimi Hines share a star)	Vaudeville performer, musician, and comedian	Downtown Palm Springs Park	January 21, 2025
William F. "Bill" Austin	Founder of Starkey Laboratories and philanthropist	219 S. Palm Canyon Dr.	May 15, 1996
The Four Freshmen	Barbershop quartet	139 S. Palm Canyon Dr.	January 20, 2013
Karrell Fox	Magician and television performer	125 S. Palm Canyon Dr.	February 18, 1996
Andy Fraga	Musician	265 S. Palm Canyon Dr.	May 19, 2001
John Frederick	Actor	123 N. Palm Canyon Dr.	June 5, 1993
Gerhard Frenzel	Theater producer and community leader. Founder of Walk of the Stars	301 N. Palm Canyon Dr.	April 20, 2006
Beth Fromm	Founder, Desert Film Society	136 N. Palm Canyon Dr.	March 23, 2023
Dale Garber (Note: Dale Garber and Terry Thomas share a star)	Musical duo	160 S. Palm Canyon Dr.	January 11, 2005
Kathy Garver	Actress	120 N. Palm Canyon Dr.	October 20, 1995
Larry Gelbart	Writer, playwright, screenwriter, director and author	123 N. Palm Canyon Dr	November 4, 1995
Judith Gelfand (Note: Marshall M. and Judith Gelfand Pikus share a star)	Teacher	100 Museum Dr.	December 5, 2012
Marshall M. Gelfand	Lawyer	100 Museum Dr.	December 5, 2012
Harry W. Gerstad	Film editor	155 S. Palm Canyon Dr.	January 11, 2003
Debbie Gibson	Singer, songwriter, and actress	130 N. Palm Canyon Dr.	March 20, 2018
Ruth Gibson	Singer, songwriter, musician and talent agent	265 S. Palm Canyon Dr.	January 24, 2000
Bonne Gilgallon	Actor, signer, model, writer and radio host	296 S. Palm Canyon Dr.	May 19, 2017
William Glenn	Cardiac surgeon	369 N. Palm Canyon Dr.	May 16, 1998
Buddy Greco	Singer	538 N. Palm Canyon Dr.	February 13, 2008
Earl Greenburg	TV producer and executive	301 N. Palm Canyon Dr.	May 12, 2001
Jimmy Greenspoon	Musician and composer	266 S. Palm Canyon Dr.	December 16, 2000
Gloria Greer	Reporter, editor, talk show hostess and publisher	123 N. Palm Canyon Dr.	October 31, 1997
Harry "Noodles" Grey	Creator of "Noodles' Aaronson"	285 S. Palm Canyon Dr.	December 31, 1999
Kathy Griffin	Comedian and actress	172 N. Palm Canyon Dr.	March 7, 2009
Merv Griffin	TV show host and media mogul	265 S. Palm Canyon Dr.	October 15, 1998
Ted Grouya	Musical composer	123 N. Palm Canyon Dr.	February 3, 1995
Harry Guardino	Actor	124 S. Palm Canyon Dr.	May 28, 1993
Eduardo "Lalo" Guerrero	Guitarist, songwriter and labor activist	368 N. Palm Canyon Dr.	May 22, 1994
Val Guest	Director and screenwriter	265 S. Palm Canyon Dr.	April 3, 2004
James "Gypsy" Haake	Drag performer	125 E. Tahquitz Canyon Way	August 23, 2015
Melvin Haber	Author and host	123 N. Palm Canyon Dr.	October 24, 1996
Buddy Hackett	Comedian and actor	266 S. Palm Canyon Dr.	December 8, 2000
Earle Hagen	Composer	100 S. Palm Canyon Dr.	April 19, 2003
Monte Hale	Actor and musician	265 S. Palm Canyon Dr.	January 16, 1998
Ron Hale	Actor	445 N. Palm Canyon Dr.	January 7, 2012
Monty Hall	Radio and TV show host	123 N. Palm Canyon Dr	December 14, 1996
George Hamilton	Actor	210 S. Palm Canyon Dr.	December 10, 1999
Elinor Harriot	Actress	Downtown Palm Springs Park	April 25, 2025
Phil Harris	Actor, bandleader, entertainer and singer	123 N. Palm Canyon Dr.	June 19, 1994
Richard Harrison	Actor, writer, director and producer	265 S. Palm Canyon Dr.	October 23, 1999
Mary Hart	TV personality and host	155 S. Palm Canyon Dr.	December 7, 2019
Susan Hart	Actress	100 S. Palm Canyon Dr.	February 14, 2003
Dick Haskamp	Bar owner, drag performer and community activist	200 S. Palm Canyon Dr.	February 8, 2014
Mikael Healey	Musician, composer, producer and singer	100 S. Palm Canyon Dr.	April 11, 2022
Horace Heidt	Musician, band leader, and radio and TV personality	265 S. Palm Canyon Dr.	May 19, 2001
Ted Herman	Orchestra leader	265 S. Palm Canyon Dr.	April 13, 1999
Little Joe Hernandez and La Familia	Tejano musician	538 N. Palm Canyon Dr.	November 4, 2006
Kristella Marie Higuera	Singer	120 S. Palm Canyon Dr.	October 25, 2009
Mimi Hines	Actress, singer, and comedian	Downtown Palm Springs Park	January 21, 2025
Joy Hodges	Singer and actress	125 S. Palm Canyon Dr.	January 17, 1997
Dene Hofheinz Anton	Songwriter	123 N. Palm Canyon Dr.	February 14, 1997
Toni Holt Kramer	Model, reporter and TV host	435 N. Palm Canyon Dr.	March 19, 1995
Bob Hope	Comedian, actor, entertainer and producer	123 N. Palm Canyon Dr.	November 15, 1992
Dolores Hope	Singer, entertainer, philanthropist	123 N. Palm Canyon Dr.	January 28, 1997
Lena Horne	Singer, actress, dancer and civil rights activist	139 S. Palm Canyon Dr.	October 26, 2012
Rich Horner (Note: Rich Horner and Lynn Stuart share a star)	Theatre owner and producer	301 N. Palm Canyon Dr.	December 8, 2000
Jackie Lee Houston	Owner, KPSP	100 Museum Dr.	March 27, 1999
Clark Howard	Author and radio/podcast host	235 S. Palm Canyon Dr.	January 7, 2011
Huell Howser	TV personality, actor, producer, writer, singer, and voice artist	160 S. Palm Canyon Dr.	October 18, 2015
Rock Hudson	Actor	189 S. Palm Canyon Dr.	October 19, 2002
Tab Hunter	Actor, singer, film producer, and author	125 S. Palm Canyon Dr.	December 8, 2007
Betty Hutton	Actress, comedian, dancer, and singer	121 S. Palm Canyon Dr.	February 26, 2013
Leo Jaffe	Film executive	123 N. Palm Canyon Dr.	March 24, 1994
Dennis James	TV personality, philanthropist, and spokesman	123 N. Palm Canyon Dr.	February 29, 1996
Herb Jeffries	Actor and musician	255 S. Palm Canyon Dr.	November 20, 1998
Beverly Johnson	Model, actress, singer, and businesswoman	155 S. Palm Canyon Dr.	December 3, 2016
Paul Mitchell Johnson	Unknown	245 S. Palm Canyon Dr.	March 2, 1999
Norman Dean Jolley	Actor, writer, and producer	109 S. Palm Canyon Dr.	November 15, 2003
Al Jolson	Singer, comedian, actor, and vaudevillian	128 S. Palm Canyon Dr.	October 14, 2000
Charles "Buck" Jones	Actor	235 S. Palm Canyon Dr.	December 6, 1997
Jack Jones	Actor and Singer	155 S. Palm Canyon Dr.	April 4, 2003
James Earl Jones	Actor	135 E. Tahquitz Canyon Way	January 7, 1996
Leslie Jordan	Actor, comedian, writer, and singer	Downtown Palm Springs Park	October 20, 2023
Lilli Joseph	Opera patron and travel agent	100 Museum Dr.	April 6, 2006
Michele Kanan	Producer	Downtown Palm Springs Park	October 19, 2022
Sean Kanan	Actor, producer, author, and martial artist	849 N. Palm Canyon Dr.	October 28, 2016
Howard Keel	Actor and Singer	123 N. Palm Canyon Dr.	April 13, 1996
Ruby Keeler	Actress, dancer, and singer, *one of inaugural recipients	123 N. Palm Canyon Dr.	February 26, 1992
Allan Keller	Operatic tenor and philanthropist	123 N. Palm Canyon Dr.	January 14, 1994
Shari Kelley	Event producer	538 N. Palm Canyon Dr.	April 4, 2009
Burt Kennedy	Screenwriter and director	245 S. Palm Canyon Dr.	April 20, 1996
Howard "Tex" Kidwell	Musician	110 N. Palm Canyon Dr.	April 8, 1994
Udo Kier	Actor	125 E. Tahquitz Canyon Way	January 3, 2020
Roberta King	Singer, musician, songwriter, poet, and actress	160 S. Palm Canyon Dr.	April 25, 2000
Gail Kobe	Actress and Producer	255 S. Palm Canyon Dr.	March 30, 2008
Murray Korda	Musician and orchestra leader	148 N. Palm Canyon Dr.	November 7, 1998
Stanley Kramer	Director and Producer	296 S. Palm Canyon Dr.	December 9, 2017
Art Laboe	Radio host, songwriter, record producer, and radio station owner	144 S. Palm Canyon Dr	November 29, 2003
Alan Ladd	Actor and Producer	100 N. Palm Canyon Dr.	January 8, 1995
Sue Carol Ladd	Actress and Talent Agent	100 N. Palm Canyon Dr.	January 24, 1998
Frankie Laine	Singer and songwriter	101 S. Palm Canyon Dr.	January 16, 2010
Sue Ane Langdon	Actress	100 S. Palm Canyon Dr.	March 8, 1997
Mario Lanza	Actor and Singer	123 N. Palm Canyon Dr.	January 31, 1998
Anndee Laskoe	Filmmaker	187 S. Palm Canyon Dr.	May 7, 2006
David Lee	Producer, director, and writer	Downtown Palm Springs Park	March 18, 2022
Peggy Lee	Singer, songwriter, and actress	100 S. Palm Canyon Dr	March 8, 2024
Ruta Lee	Actress and dancer	445 N. Palm Canyon Dr.	January 15, 1995
Andrea Leeds	Actress	193 S. Palm Canyon Dr.	March 11, 1994
Liberace	Musician, singer and actor	100 N. Palm Canyon Dr.	January 7, 1994
Hal Linden	Actor, director and musician	262 S. Palm Canyon Dr.	December 6, 2002
Roberta Linn	Singer	100 S. Palm Canyon Dr.	March 25, 1995
Nelda Linsk	Socialite and philanthropist	155 S. Palm Canyon Dr.	February 22, 2018
Rich Little	Comedian, impressionist and voice actor	265 S. Palm Canyon Dr.	November 14, 1998
Frederick Loewe	Musical composer	123 N. Palm Canyon Dr.	January 13, 1995
Josephine Lombardo	Operatic soprano	333 N. Palm Canyon Dr.	November 10, 2001
George Lopez	Comedian and actor	235 S. Palm Canyon Dr.	January 19, 2007
Trini Lopez	Singer and musician	101 N. Palm Canyon Dr.	May 21, 1993
Sophia Loren	Actress	135 E. Tahquitz Canyon Way	January 9, 1994
Don Luster	Singer, and songwriter	102 N. Palm Canyon Dr.	April 25, 2013
Pierce Lyden	Actor	245 S. Palm Canyon Dr.	January 27, 1996
Arthur Lyons	Writer	262 S. Palm Canyon Dr.	May 30, 2007
James MacArthur	Actor and recording artist	301 N. Palm Canyon Dr.	January 13, 2001
Gavin MacLeod	Actor	102 N. Palm Canyon Dr.	February 1, 2014
Guy Madison	Actor	265 S. Palm Canyon Dr.	October 16, 1996
Anita Maltin	Music Hall Performer	160 S. Palm Canyon Dr.	March 12, 1999
Johnny Mann	Composer, conductor, entertainer, singer, and recording artist	123 N. Palm Canyon Dr.	April 4, 1998
Bill Marx	Musician	265 S. Palm Canyon Dr.	March 23, 2002
Harpo Marx	Comedian and harpist	265 S. Palm Canyon Dr.	March 23, 2002
Michael Masser	Songwriter, composer and producer	155 S. Palm Canyon Dr.	December 14, 2002
Ross Mathews	TV host and personality	369 N. Palm Canyon Dr.	November 5, 2016
Dan McGrath	Writer, educator and director	150 S. Palm Canyon Dr.	September 26, 2007
Mike Meenan	Radio personality	160 S. Palm Canyon Dr.	March 24, 2000
Bob Merlis	Public relations executive	445 N. Palm Canyon Dr.	November 8, 2008
Bobby Milano	Musician	115 S. Palm Canyon Dr.	April 30, 2006
Ann Miller	Actress and dancer	123 N. Palm Canyon Dr.	January 10, 1998
Robin Lynn Miller	Singer	146 N. Palm Canyon Dr.	January 23, 1998
Gordon "Whitey" Mitchell	Musician, writer and producer	128 S. Palm Canyon Dr.	February 20, 2006
George Momb	Musician	160 S. Palm Canyon Dr.	February 16, 2002
Marilyn Monroe (Note: Star was rededicated. Second dedication was on June 1, 2012)	Actor, singer and model	101 S. Palm Canyon Dr.	December 1, 1995
Montie Montana	Rodeo trick rider and trick roper, actor, stuntman and cowboy	265 S. Palm Canyon Dr.	April 27, 1996
George Montgomery	Actor	100 Museum Dr.	April 28, 1995
Gloria Monty	Producer	123 N. Palm Canyon Dr.	January 10, 1997
Grace Moody (Note: Grace and Phil Moody share a star)	Owners, Moody's Super Club	123 N. Palm Canyon Dr.	April 2, 1994
Phil Moody	Owners, Moody's Super Club	123 N. Palm Canyon Dr.	April 2, 1994
Jan Murray	Comedian, actor, and game-show host	123 N. Palm Canyon Dr.	April 19, 1997
George Nader	Actor and writer	189 S. Palm Canyon Dr.	October 19, 2002
Ricky Nelson	Actor and musician	100 S. Palm Canyon Dr.	March 27, 1994
The New Christy Minstrels (Note: Randy Sparks and The New Christy Minstrels share a star)	Musical group	538 N. Palm Canyon Dr.	January 12, 2009
Arthur Newman (Note: Arthur and Patty Newman share a star)	Film executive, philanthropist and politician	100 S. Palm Canyon Dr.	January 22, 2012
Patty Newman	Unknown	100 S. Palm Canyon Dr.	January 22, 2012
Wayne Newton	Singer and actor	100 S. Palm Canyon Dr.	November 9, 2018
Leslie Nielsen	Actor and comedian	445 N. Palm Canyon Dr.	December 4, 1997
Ron Nyswaner	Screenwriter and director	1301 N. Palm Canyon Dr.	May 30, 2024
Donald O'Connor	Dancer, singer and actor	123 N. Palm Canyon Dr.	January 9, 1998
Ron Oliver	Writer, director, producer and actor	222 S. Palm Canyon Dr.	May 23, 2025
Andrew P. Ordon	Doctor and Talk Show Host	194 S. Palm Canyon Dr.	January 15, 2011
William T. Orr	Actor and Producer	102 N. Palm Canyon Dr.	April 1, 1994
Robert “The Red Baron” Osterberg	Radio personality	198 S. Palm Canyon Dr.	January 19, 2008
Colonel Tom Parker	Talent manager and concert promoter	100 S. Palm Canyon Dr.	March 27, 1994
Mary Parks	Journalist	111 N. Palm Canyon Dr	March 3, 2023
William "Countess Bijou" Perez	Drag queen and community activist	369 N. Palm Canyon Dr.	June 7, 2016
Roger Perry	Actor	110 N. Palm Canyon Dr.	November 29, 2014
Alfie "Ariel TramPway" Pettit	Drag queen and community activist	849 N. Palm Canyon Dr.	September 6, 2016
"Papa" John Phillips	Musician, singer, and songwriter	136 N. Palm Canyon Dr	November 15, 1996
Mary Pickford	Actress and producer	123 N. Palm Canyon Dr.	November 16, 1993
Mario Pikus (Note: Mario and Rebecca Pikus share a star)	Artists and humanitarians	849 N. Palm Canyon Dr.	November 18, 2017
Rebecca Pikus	Artists and humanitarians	849 N. Palm Canyon Dr.	November 18, 2017
Eileen ("Mike") Pollock (Note: Eileen and Robert Pollock share a star)	Screenwriters and producers	123 N. Palm Canyon Dr.	April 17, 1997
Robert ("Bob") Pollock	Screenwriters and producers	123 N. Palm Canyon Dr.	April 17, 1997
Diana "Mousie" Powell	Actress	134 S. Palm Canyon Dr.	February 14, 2000
William Powell	Actor, *one of inaugural recipients	123 N. Palm Canyon Dr.	February 26, 1992
Elvis Presley	Singer and Actor	100 S. Palm Canyon Dr.	March 27, 1994
Victoria Principal	Actress, producer, entrepreneur, and author	155 S. Palm Canyon Dr.	November 13, 2003
Bianca Rae	Reporter	155 S. Palm Canyon Dr.	June 2, 2017
Frankie Randall	Singer and pianist	155 S. Palm Canyon Dr.	May 12, 2001
Melinda Read	TV Host	144 S. Palm Canyon Dr.	April 30, 2005
Della Reese	Singer, actress, television personality, author and ordained minister	515 N. Palm Canyon Dr.	April 26, 2015
Line Renaud	Singer, actress and AIDS activist	155 S. Palm Canyon Dr.	February 12, 2000
Debbie Reynolds	Actress, singer and entrepreneur	155 S. Palm Canyon Dr.	January 4, 2000
Jody Reynolds	Singer, guitarist, and songwriter	100 S. Palm Canyon Dr.	December 8, 1999
Edgar Rice Burroughs	Writer	Downtown Palm Springs Park	April 4, 2023
Buddy Rich	Drummer, songwriter, conductor, and bandleader	124 S. Palm Canyon Dr.	September 30, 2017
The Ritz Brothers	Family comedy act	123 N. Palm Canyon Dr.	October 26, 1996
Pat Rizzo	Musician	360 N. Palm Canyon Dr.	November 30, 2016
Charles "Buddy" Rogers	Actor and Musician	123 N. Palm Canyon Dr.	November 26, 1993
Ginger Rogers	Actress, dancer and singer	123 N. Palm Canyon Dr.	November 26, 1993
Roy Rogers	Singer, actor, television host, and rodeo performer	100 Museum Dr.	May 5, 2001
Tristan Rogers	Actor	849 N. Palm Canyon Dr.	November 18, 2024
Mickey Rooney	Singer and Actor	135 E. Tahquitz Canyon Way	January 11, 1996
Sandler and Young	Musical duo	121 S. Palm Canyon Dr.	April 1, 1998
Jeffrey Sanker	Founder, White Party Entertainment	200 S. Palm Canyon Dr.	March 13, 2014
John Schlesinger	Director, and actor	155 S. Palm Canyon Dr.	January 10, 2003
Jon Schroeder	Producer and writer	144 S. Palm Canyon Dr.	December 20, 2019
Diane Schuur	Musician	112 N. Palm Canyon Dr.	December 1, 2016
Ettore Scola	Screenwriter and director	135 E. Tahquitz Canyon Way	January 10, 1997
Randolph Scott	Actor	100 Museum Dr.	April 16, 1999
Ken Seeley	Author and TV personality	101 S. Palm Canyon Dr.	November 26, 2011
Antheny Shane	Singer and business owner	362 N. Palm Canyon Dr.	December 2, 1999
Lew Sherrell	Talent agent	123 N. Palm Canyon Dr.	March 11, 1995
Dinah Shore	Singer, actress, TV personality	100 Museum Dr.	March 23, 1996
Del Shores	Director, producer, screenwriter, playwright and actor	538 N. Palm Canyon Dr.	October 5, 2006
Joy Short	Journalist	128 S. Palm Canyon Dr.	June 12, 2005
Charles Shows	Writer, director and producer	139 S. Palm Canyon Dr.	March 15, 1997
Melville "Buddy" Shyer	Director, screenwriter and producer	457 N. Palm Canyon Dr.	March 6, 2020
Ginny Simms	Singer and actress	123 N. Palm Canyon Dr.	June 5, 1995
Frank Sinatra Jr.	Singer, songwriter, and conductor	125 S. Palm Canyon Dr.	February 28, 2008
Barbara Sinatra	Model, showgirl, socialite, and philanthropist	123 N. Palm Canyon Dr.	February 4, 1998
Frank Sinatra	Singer and actor	123 N. Palm Canyon Dr.	January 15, 1994
Nancy Sinatra	Singer, actress, producer and author	155 S. Palm Canyon Dr.	May 9, 2002
Keely Smith	Singer	111 S. Palm Canyon Dr.	October 13, 1998
Elke Sommer	Actress	155 S. Palm Canyon Dr.	December 7, 2001
Randy Sparks	Musician, singer-songwriter	538 N. Palm Canyon Dr.	January 12, 2009
Sandy Spivack	Dancer, choreographer, and artistic director of the McCallum Theatre	140 N. Palm Canyon Dr.	December 30, 1997
Robert Stack	Actor and TV host	445 N. Palm Canyon Dr.	December 6, 1996
Susan Stafford	Model, actress and television host	189 S. Palm Canyon Dr.	October 15, 2005
Billy Steinberg	Songwriter	101 S. Palm Canyon Dr.	October 18, 2008
Connie Stevens	Actress and singer	114 N. Palm Canyon Dr.	May 20, 1994
Larry Storch	Actor and comedian	140 N. Palm Canyon Dr.	September 16, 2014
Lynn Stuart	Actress and producer	301 N. Palm Canyon Dr.	December 8, 2000
KC and the Sunshine Band	Musical group	144 S. Palm Canyon Dr.	July 6, 2013
Alvin Taylor	Drummer, producer, musical director, and author	111 S. Palm Canyon Dr.	February 24, 2018
Elizabeth Taylor	Actress	435 N. Palm Canyon Dr.	January 21, 1994
Judy Tenuta	Comedian and actress	184 N. Palm Canyon Dr.	November 4, 2019
Ruth Terry	Singer and actress	130 N. Palm Canyon Dr.	May 24, 1996
Terry Thomas	Musical duo	160 S. Palm Canyon Dr.	January 11, 2005
Sunny Thompson	Singer and actress	105 S. Palm Canyon Dr.	February 22, 2019
Jerry Thorpe (Note: Richard Thorpe and his son Jerry Thorpe share a star)	Director and producer	100 N. Palm Canyon Dr.	November 21, 2003
Richard Thorpe	Director	100 N. Palm Canyon Dr.	November 21, 2003
Lily Tomlin (Note: Lily Tomlin and Jane Wagner share a star)	Actress, comedian, writer, singer, and producer	515 N. Palm Canyon Dr.	March 16, 2012
Bill Torrance	Broadcaster and entertainer	222 S. Palm Canyon Dr.	March 18, 2008
Don Tosti	Musician and composer	200 S. Palm Canyon Dr.	May 4, 1999
Jerry Vale	Singer	255 S. Palm Canyon Dr.	December 5, 1998
Rudy Vallée	Singer, saxophonist, bandleader, actor, and entertainer	123 N. Palm Canyon Dr.	January 13, 1995
Mamie Van Doren	Actress, singer, and model	109 S. Palm Canyon Dr.	December 3, 2005
Dick Van Patten	Actor, comedian, businessman	125 E. Tahquitz Canyon Way	January 12, 2008
Lisa Vanderpump	Actress and TV personality	155 S. Palm Canyon Dr.	July 30, 2014
Russell Wade	Actor	123 N. Palm Canyon Dr.	June 22, 1997
Jane Wagner	Writer, director and producer	515 N. Palm Canyon Dr.	March 16, 2012
Lindsay Wagner	Actress	515 N. Palm Canyon Dr.	May 12, 2012
Brian “Bella da Ball” Wanzek	Drag performer	369 N. Palm Canyon Dr.	November 9, 2013
Fred Waring	Musician, bandleader, choral director, and radio and TV personality	123 N. Palm Canyon Dr.	April 11, 1997
Dionne Warwick	Singer, actress, and TV host	100 S. Palm Canyon Dr.	December 8, 2021
Jerry Weintraub	Producer, talent manager and actor	538 N. Palm Canyon Dr.	December 10, 2007
Adam West	Actor	101 S. Palm Canyon Dr.	April 10, 2010
Dan Westfall	Animal Trainer for film and TV	100 S. Palm Canyon Dr.	October 9, 2010
Natalie Wood	Actress	538 N. Palm Canyon Dr.	December 7, 2007
Jane Wyman	Actress	369 N. Palm Canyon Dr.	May 11, 2014
Loretta Young	Actress	121 S. Palm Canyon Dr.	May 19, 2011
George Zander	LGBTQ+ rights activist	205 S. Palm Canyon Dr.	April 4, 2016

== Humanitarian ==
Name	Description	Address	Date
Dr. Scott Aaronson	Plastic surgeon	120 N. Palm Canyon Dr.	May 18, 2014
Sam Bianco (Note: Sam Bianco and Mark Liddy share a star)	Businessmen and humanitrains	435 N. Palm Canyon Dr.	April 28, 2008
Mary Bono	Politician, businesswoman, and lobbyist	101 N. Palm Canyon Dr.	March 18, 2025
Dr Patricia Bragg (Note: Dr. Paul and Dr. Patricia Bragg, Jr share a star)	Health food advocates and fitness enthusiasts	100 S. Palm Canyon Dr.	November 15, 2015
Dr Paul Bragg	Health food advocates and fitness enthusiasts	100 S. Palm Canyon Dr.	November 15, 2015
Timothy Ray Brown	First person cured of HIV/AIDS	Downtown Palm Springs Park	December 1, 2023
Steve Chase	Director of the Advocacy for Social Justice and Sustainability	101 N Museum Dr.	January 25, 2019
Sir Alfred J. DiMora	Luxury car manufacturer	538 N. Palm Canyon Dr.	November 15, 2009
Elizabeth "Beth" Edwards Harris	Architectural historian	300 S. Palm Canyon Dr.	February 14, 2025
Lee Erwin (Note: Timothy Jochen and Lee Erwin a star)	Dermatologists and humanitarians	538 N. Palm Canyon Dr.	February 4, 2017
Georgia Fogelson (Note: Georgia and Gerald Fogelson share a star)	Humanitarians and philanthropist	101 Museum Dr.	March 23, 2017
Gerald Fogelson	Humanitarian, philanthropist and real estate developer	101 Museum Dr.	March 23, 2017
Helene Galen	Philanthropist	100 Museum Dr.	March 9, 2015
Renée Glickman	Humanitarian, philanthropist and teacher	100 S. Palm Canyon Dr.	March 27, 2013
Myra Goldwater	Real estate agent and executive	285 S. Palm Canyon Dr.	January 22, 2008
Leon Greenberg	Restauranteur and humanitarian	255 S. Palm Canyon Dr.	September 18, 2004
Chuck Hodges (Note: Chuck and Gayle Hodges share a star)	Businessman	538 N. Palm Canyon Dr.	November 3, 2007
Gayle Hodges	Flight attendant	538 N. Palm Canyon Dr.	November 3, 2007
Earl Hoover (Note: Earl and Miriam Hoover share a star)	Philanthropists	101 Museum Dr.	May 8, 2008
Miriam Hoover	Philanthropists	101 Museum Dr.	May 8, 2008
Bob Hoven	Publisher, MEGA-Scene and drag performer	200 S. Palm Canyon Dr.	January 15, 2007
Janie Hughes	Civic leader	538 N. Palm Canyon Dr.	November 3, 2007
Joseph Hurwitz	Rabbi, Temple Isaiah	La Plaza Court	January 20, 1999
Timothy Jochen	Dermatologists and humanitarians	538 N. Palm Canyon Dr.	February 4, 2017
Barbara Keller	Artist, poet, author, playwright, director, teacher	200 S. Palm Canyon Dr.	February 3, 2012
Terri Ketover	Humanitarian	101 N. Palm Canyon Dr.	November 2, 2021
Mark Liddy	Businessmen and humanitrains	435 N. Palm Canyon Dr.	April 28, 2008
Donna MacMillian (Note: Donna and Cargill MacMillan, Jr share a star)	Philanthropist	100 Museum Dr.	December 23, 2016
Cargill MacMillian, Jr.	Businessman and philanthropist	100 Museum Dr.	December 23, 2016
Michael McCarthy	Merrill Lynch executive, AMEX and NYSE governor, and community leader	415 S. Palm Canyon Dr.	April 11, 2000
Dorothy Meyerman (Note: Listed in the Architect/Artist/Designer category) (Note: Dorothy and Harold Meyermanshare a star)	Philanthropists	100 Museum Dr.	February 14, 2012
Harold Meyerman	Philanthropists	100 Museum Dr.	February 14, 2012
Albert T. Milauskas	Ophthalmologist and philanthropist	891 N. Palm Canyon Dr.	February 22, 2022
Rabbi Sally Olins	Rabbi	875 N. Palm Canyon Dr.	June 4, 2017
Janice Oliphant (Note: Richard and Janice Oliphant share a star)	Educator and philanthropist	100 S. Palm Canyon Dr.	May 5, 2016
Richard Oliphant	Developer, philanthropist and politician	100 S. Palm Canyon Dr.	May 5, 2016
Betty Lou Oppenheim	Founder, People Helping People USA	333 N. Palm Canyon Dr.	April 17, 1999
Paul Reed Yinger	Adult film actor and AIDS activist	100 E. Arenas Rd.	October 27, 2023
Jeanne Reller-Brownstein	Medical administrator	222 S. Palm Canyon Dr.	October 26, 2008
Jennette Rockefeller	Socialite and former First Lady of Arkansas	333 N. Palm Canyon Dr.	October 3, 1998
Harvey Sarner (Note: Harvey and Lori Sarner share a star)	Attorney and philanthropist	100 S. Palm Canyon Dr.	April 6, 2001
Lori Sarner	Philanthropist	100 S. Palm Canyon Dr.	April 6, 2001
José Julio Sarria	Drag performer and political activist	Downtown Palm Springs Park	December 12, 2022
Ann Sheffer	Artist, educator and civic leader	Downtown Palm Springs Park	April 12, 2023
Peter Siva	Chair, Agua Caliente Tribal Council	400 E. Tahquitz Canyon Way	June 14, 1996
Dr. Mark V. Sofonio	Plastic surgeon	262 S. Palm Canyon Dr.	March 8, 2008
Dr Sharron Stroud	Spiritual leader and humanitarian	221 S. Palm Canyon Dr.	November 14, 2015
Gwendolyn Weiner	Philanthropist	101 Museum Dr.	November 16, 2008

== Literary ==
Name	Description	Address	Date
Douglas Brown	Editor, Palm Springs Desert Post	123 N. Palm Canyon Dr.	November 7, 1997
Mildred L. Brown	Author	219 S. Palm Canyon Dr.	February 24, 2016
Truman Capote	Author	100 S. Palm Canyon Dr.	November 28, 2016
William Edelen	Philosopher, author and columnist	265 S. Palm Canyon Dr.	January 15, 2006
Dr. Judi Hollis	Author, weight-loss pioneer	144 S. Palm Canyon Dr.	January 9, 2010
Helen Hunt Jackson	Poet, novalist and advocate for Native American rights	Downtown Palm Springs Park	April 16, 2025
Jason Matthews	Novalist	125 E. Tahquitz Canyon Way	April 12, 2014
William Montapert	Author	265 S. Palm Canyon Dr.	February 20, 1999
Jim Murray	Los Angeles Times sportswriter, established the Jim Murray Memorial Foundation	200 S. Palm Canyon Dr.	November 28, 2008
Andrew Neiderman	Novelist	369 N. Palm Canyon Dr.	October 17, 1997
Darryl Ponicsan	Writer	132 S. Palm Canyon Dr.	January 2, 2017
Pamela Price	Journalist and writer, Palm Springs Life	100 S. Palm Canyon Dr.	January 25, 2003
Sidney Sheldon	Author	123 N. Palm Canyon Dr.	February 25, 1994

== Military ==
Name	Description	Address	Date
Robert E. Bush, HM1	US Navy	155 S. Palm Canyon Dr.	November 10, 1999
James Lewis Day, Maj. Gen.	US Marine Corps	155 S. Palm Canyon Dr.	November 10, 1999
Thomas Henry, Col. (Note: Listed in the Humanitarian category)	Combat veteran and cofounder of Delta Force	150 S. Palm Canyon Dr.	November 13, 2011
William McGonagle, Capt.	US Navy, awarded for heroism during the 1967 USS Liberty incident	155 S. Palm Canyon Dr.	November 10, 1999
Lewis Millett, Col.	US Marine Corps	155 S. Palm Canyon Dr.	November 10, 1999
Mitchell Paige, Col.	US Army	155 S. Palm Canyon Dr.	November 10, 1999
General George S. Patton	World War II general	128 S. Palm Canyon Dr.	November 12, 2016
