= Charles Elwyn Du Bois =

Mid-Century modern architect

Charles Du Bois
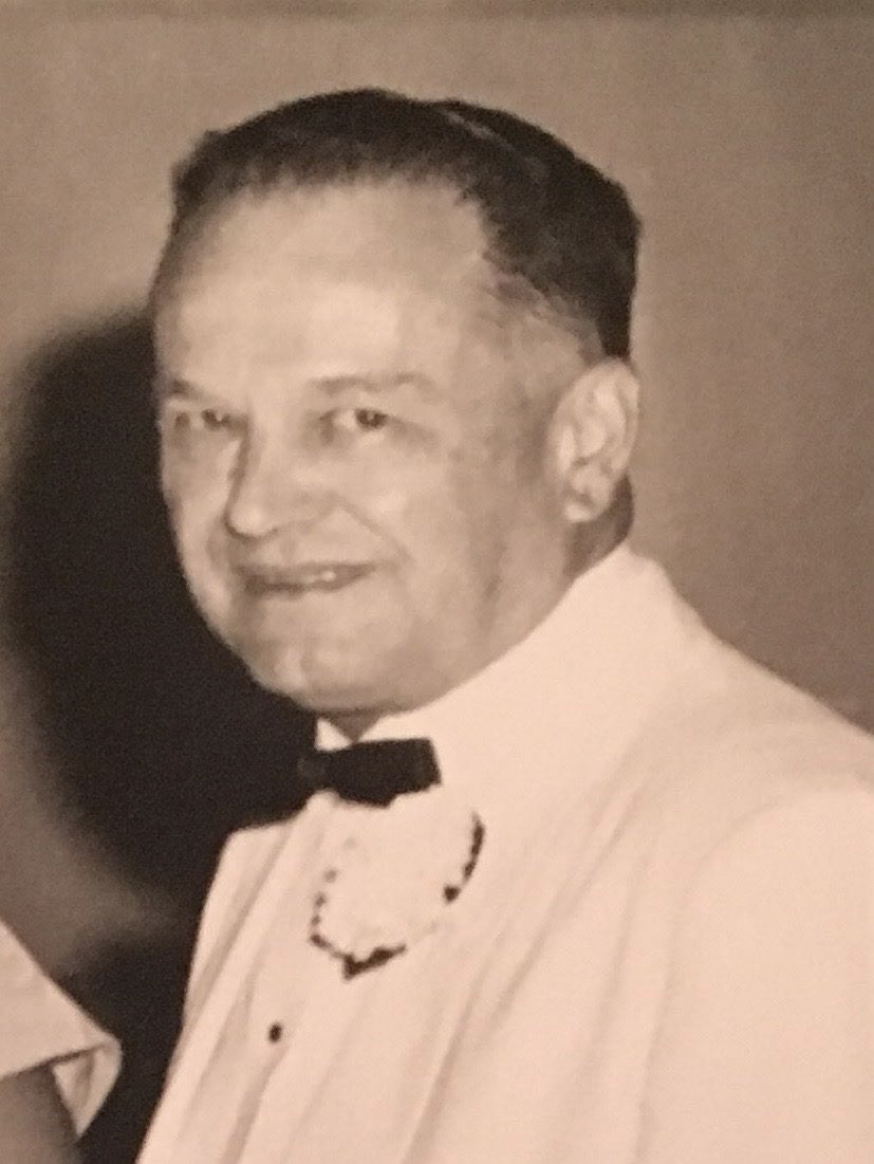
- Born: Charles Elwyn Du Bois; April 9, 1903; Rochester, New York, U.S.
- Died: December 29, 1996 (aged 93); Santa Clara County, California, U.S.
- Occupation: Architect
- Years active: 1920s–1970s
- Known for: Mid‑century modern tract housing; Palm Springs “Swiss Miss” A‑frame homes

Charles Elwyn Du Bois, AIA, (April 9, 1903 – December 29, 1996) was an American architect known for residential subdivisions and desert modernist homes in Southern California. He designed tract communities in the Los Angeles basin and stylized homes in Palm Springs and Palm Desert during the 1950s–1970s.

== Early life and education ==
Du Bois was born in Rochester, New York in 1903. By his teens, he had moved to Glendale, California, where he was raised by an uncle. He graduated from Glendale High School in 1921 and studied architecture at UCLA and MIT. Early in his career, he worked as a draftsman for Walker & Eisen, Gogerty & Weyl, and Horatio W. Bishop, exposing him to Spanish Colonial Revival, Art Deco, and Moderne architectural styles.

Du Bois passed the California architecture licensing exams in the late 1930s and established an office at 5143 Sunset Boulevard in Hollywood in 1938. During World War II, when residential building slowed, he worked as a senior set designer for MGM Studios.

== Career in Southern California ==
=== Postwar tract housing ===
Following WWII, Du Bois designed several subdivisions catering to returning veterans and middle‑class families. His developments included Riviera Beach Estates in Torrance (1955), Fairwood Estates Granada Hills, Santa Anita Estates in East Pasadena, Deauville Estates in Tarzana, and Woodland West in Woodland Hill (1959–64). Woodland West comprised about 1,300 homes, featuring low-pitched gable roofs, Palos Verdes stone cladding, double doors with brass pull handles, and curving street layouts. A street was later named "DuBois Avenue".

The design approach was functional, consistent, and aimed at efficient mass production with stylistic flair. Du Bois often worked with Don‑Ja‑Ran Construction and Peerless Building Company in these developments.

=== Palm Springs and Desert Modernism ===
In Palm Springs, Du Bois worked extensively with the Alexander Construction Company and developer Joe Dunas. He rejected flat and butterfly roofs, instead offering a series of steep A-frame homes between 1958 and 1962 in Vista Las Palmas, often referred to as “Swiss Miss” or “Alohaus”. The design typically included vaulted tongue‑and‑groove ceilings, stone fireplaces, clerestory glass walls, and front/rear porches offering shade and views.

He also designed Sunrise Lanai (1962–64), a 22-unit A-frame condominium cluster; Las Palmas Summit (1962–63), a boutique themed tract marketed with Hawaiian motifs; and Purple Hills Estates (~1962) in Palm Desert comprising 47 custom homes. In September 2025, Palm Springs Historic Site Preservation Board approved one of the complex's buildings - known as Desert Lanai I - as a class one Historic District.

His largest Palm Springs commission was Canyon Estates (1968–73), beside Indian Canyons Golf Course, built by developer Roy Fey. Canyon Estates was a $25 million resort-style development on 110 acres offering 254 units, a clubhouse, pools, spa, tennis courts, and an executive golf course. Homebuyers chose from six floor plans in architectural styles including Contemporary, Spanish, Polynesian, and Desert Contemporary.

== Design style ==
Du Bois combined practical Modernist principles, such as post-and-beam framing, open plans, indoor–outdoor living, with decorative flourishes influenced by Polynesian and Hollywood Regency motifs. Stone detail, vaulted ceilings, and scenic glass walls were signature elements. His A-frame homes drew criticism during the period including dismissive comparisons to “Disneyland” architecture, but later came to be reappraised as distinctive and forward‑thinking contributions to desert modernism.

== Later years and legacy ==
Du Bois remained active into the early 1970s, though his tract-style aesthetic fell from favor as architectural trends shifted. He retired in the mid‑1970s and died in 1996 at age 93 in Santa Clara County.

In recent years, his work has been featured during Palm Springs Modernism Week, and restoration of his homes, including example tours by Atomic Ranch, is common. Preservationists now list Woodland West as a historic district, and Du Bois is increasingly acknowledged alongside other Desert Modernist architects such as Albert Frey, William Krisel, Donald Wexler, and Richard Harrison.

== Selected works ==
- Charles Du Bois Residence (1954). A custom modern home in Los Angeles, later restored. The house became part of his early reputational development.
- Riviera Beach Estates (1955). A tract of ranch homes in the Palos Verdes Riviera, Torrance, California.
- Woodland West (1959–64). Approximately 1,300 Modern Ranch homes in Woodland Hills, Los Angeles which is now a recognized historic district.
- Vista Las Palmas “Swiss Miss” Houses (1958–62). Approximately 15 chalet‑style A‑frame homes in Palm Springs, characterized by vaulted interiors and integrated indoor-outdoor layout.
- Sunrise Lanai (1962–64). A 22-unit condominium cluster in Palm Springs featuring double‑height A‑frame gables.
- Las Palmas Summit (1962–63). A themed residential tract adjacent to Vista Las Palmas marketed with tropical features.
- Purple Hills Estates (~1962) – 47 custom homes in Palm Desert with Desert Modernist and Polynesian design aspects.
- Canyon Estates (1968–73) – large resort‑style master plan including homes, clubhouse, golf course, and tennis, adjacent to Indian Canyons in Palm Springs.
