= Roy Fey =

American real estate developer in Palm Springs

- Born: October 12, 1915; Chicago, Illinois, U.S.
- Died: November 13, 2000 (aged 85); Palm Springs, California, U.S.
- Burial place: Desert Memorial Park
- Education: Northwestern University
- Occupation: Real estate developer
- Known for: Mid-century modern housing in Palm Springs
- Spouse: Ethel Leah Wiograd Fey (m. 1938)

Roy Fey (October 12, 1915 – November 13, 2000) was an American real estate developer active in Palm Springs, California during the mid-20th century. Originally from Chicago, he transitioned from accounting and manufacturing into homebuilding before relocating to Palm Springs in 1955. There, he established a real estate and construction business and was involved in the development of several residential communities, including early examples of condominium housing in the region. Fey collaborated with architects such as Charles Du Bois, Donald Wexler, Hugh M. Kaptur, Richard A. Harrison, and William Krisel.

== Early life and Chicago career ==
Roy Fey was born in 1915 in Chicago, Illinois. He began his professional career as an accountant, establishing an accountancy firm in 1940. After World War II, he expanded into homebuilding and by the early 1950s had developed an estimated 3,000 homes in the Chicago area. Fey operated several manufacturing businesses during this period, including a women’s apparel company and an electronics parts business.

== Move to Palm Springs ==
In 1955, Fey moved to Palm Springs with his wife, Ethel, citing the health benefits of the desert climate. He established Fey’s Canyon Estates Realty and the Fey Construction Company and began developing residential and commercial properties in the area. One of his early acquisitions was the Desert Skies apartment-hotel, which he converted into individually owned housing units in 1962, becoming the first condominium complex in the area. At the time, the condominium ownership model was new in the region and required customized documentation to implement.

== Notable developments ==
Fey developed several residential communities in Palm Springs, many of which incorporated mid-century modern architectural style. His projects include:

=== Caballeros Estates (1959) ===
Located in central Palm Springs, this subdivision initially included homes designed by the architectural firm Wexler & Harrison. It is one of the earliest tract housing developments in the area to feature modernist design.

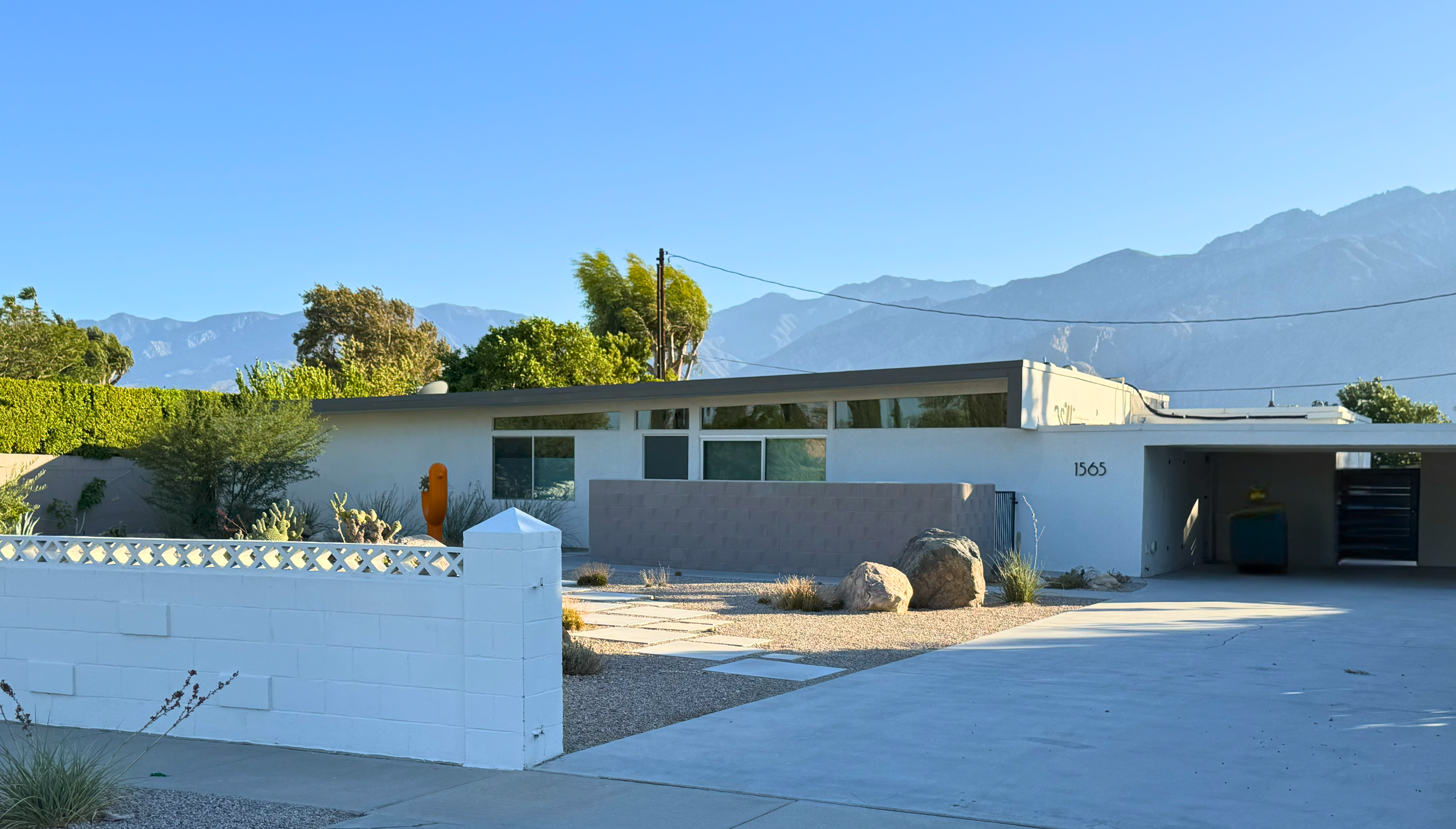
Jack LaLanne's House in El Rancho Vista Estates

=== El Rancho Vista Estates (1959–1962) ===
This 75-home tract was developed with Wexler & Harrison, using three recurring floor plans. The neighborhood includes homes with butterfly roofs, decorative concrete block, and other modernist elements. It has been included in local preservation tours.

=== Canyon View Estates (1962–1966) ===
Designed by Palmer & Krisel and built by Alexander Construction Co., Canyon View Estates was one of the first condominium-style residential communities in Palm Springs. The homes feature breezeblock screens, and clerestory windows. The original design included 225 homes, however 45 homes were eliminated in favor of more green space. The development has been used in media and preservation campaigns and appeared in the 2022 film Don’t Worry Darling.

=== Canyon Estates (1968–1973) ===
This master-planned development included 254 homes, a central clubhouse, and recreational amenities. Architect Charles DuBois designed the floor plans, and the project was backed by Great-West Life. Amenities included tennis courts, pools, and a 9-hole golf course.

=== Country Club Estates (1965) ===
This project was developed in partnership with Fey and architects A. Quincy Jones and Frederick Emmons, and is the only residential housing project in Palm Springs by Jones. It included 30 homes, and the Desert Sun described the community as "a distinctly Californian expression of modernism characterized by simple post-and-beam construction, warm woods and other natural materials, integrated systems and inviting scale."

== Community impact ==
Fey was involved in the early use of condominium ownership models, beginning with the conversion of the Desert Skies apartment-hotel. He also worked on developments that included shared amenities and land-lease arrangements with tribal authorities. In 1982, he became a founding board member of the Bank of Palm Springs, which was established provide local financing in the Coachella Valley.

== Legacy ==
By some estimates, Roy Fey was involved in the construction of more than 1,200 homes in the Coachella Valley. Several of his developments, including Canyon View Estates and El Rancho Vista Estates, have been included in preservation efforts and architectural tours, such as those organized during Modernism Week.

In January 2020, the Kramer Residence, at 800 East Granvia Valmonte in The Movie Colony neighborhood, was designated as a Class 1 Historic Resource by Palm Springs City Council and the Palm Springs Historic Site Preservation Board. The residence is located in Fey's Caballero Estates community.

Subsequently, in October 2024, the Ratner Residence, located at 1633 Via Roberto Miguel in the El Rancho Vista Estates neighborhood, was designated as a Class 1 Historic Resource by Palm Springs City Council and the Palm Springs Historic Site Preservation Board.

Fey and his wife were also active in civic and religious organizations. He served as the president of the Palm Springs Jewish Welfare Federation, on the board of Temple Isaiah and the United Jewish Appeal, director of the Jewish Welfare Federation, member of B’nai B’rith, and was president of the Jewish Welfare Federation. He was active in local fundraising efforts, chairing a telethon for United Cerebral Palsy. Fey was recognized for his contributions, including:

- The Boys’ Club of Palm Springs presented Fey with the Silver Life Membership Award
- The Hebrew Union College-Union of American Hebrew Congregations and the University of Judaism recognized Fey for his philanthropic and civic contributions
- The Palm Springs Chapter of the City of Hope named the Feys as the Man and Woman of the Year for their philanthropic work

== Personal life ==
Fey married Ethel Lee Wiograd in December 23, 1939. They had two children. He died November 13, 2000.
