= Te Necesito =

Te Necesito (I Need You) may refer to:

- Te Necesito, an album by Sunny Thompson
- "Te Necesito", a song by Amaral from Estrella de mar, 2002
- "Te Necesito", a song by Flor Silvestre, 1966
- "Te Necesito", a song by José Enrique Sarabia, 2015
- "Te Necesito", a song by Julissa, 1966
- "Te Necesito", a song by Kabah, 2001
- "Te Necesito", a song by Khea, 2021
- "Te Necesito", a song by Los Cuñaos
- "Te Necesito", a song written by Luis Demetrio
- "Te Necesito", a song by Luis Miguel from 33, 2003
- "Te Necesito", a song by Matt Hunter, 2016
- "Te Necesito", a song by Rojo from Apasionado por Ti, 2009
- "Te Necesito", a song by Shakira from Pies Descalzos, 1995
- "Te Necesito", a song by Thalía from Mundo de Cristal, 1991
- Yo Te Necesito, a 1982 album by Los Bukis
