= El Rancho Vista Estates =

Neighborhood in Palm Springs, CA

- Neighborhoods of Palm Springs, California
- El Rancho Vista Estates Logo
- Interactive map of El Rancho Vista Estates
- Coordinates: 33°50′38″N 116°30′30″W
- Country: United States
- State: California
- County: Riverside County
- City: Palm Springs
- City Council Districts: 2

Government
  - Council Member: Jeffrey Bernstein
  - State Assembly: Greg Wallis, Rep.
  - State Senate: Rosilicie Ochoa Bogh, Rep.
  - US Representatives: Ken Calvert, Rep.
  - US Senate: Alex Padilla, Dem. Adam B. Schiff, Dem.

El Rancho Vista Estates is one of the recognized neighborhood in Palm Springs, California, located in northeast Palm Springs, just east of the Palm Springs International Airport, bound by Vista Chino to the north, Gene Autry Trail to the east, Chia Road to the south, and the airport property to the west.

The neighborhood features homes designed by architects Donald Wexler and Richard Harrison, who were associated with the Desert Modernism architectural style. The neighborhood has been featured as part of the city's Modernism Week.

In 2010, El Rancho Vista Estates is one of the 52 legally recognized neighborhoods in Palm Springs by the City of Palm Springs Office of Neighborhoods and is part of the Organized Neighborhoods of Palm Springs (ONE-PS).

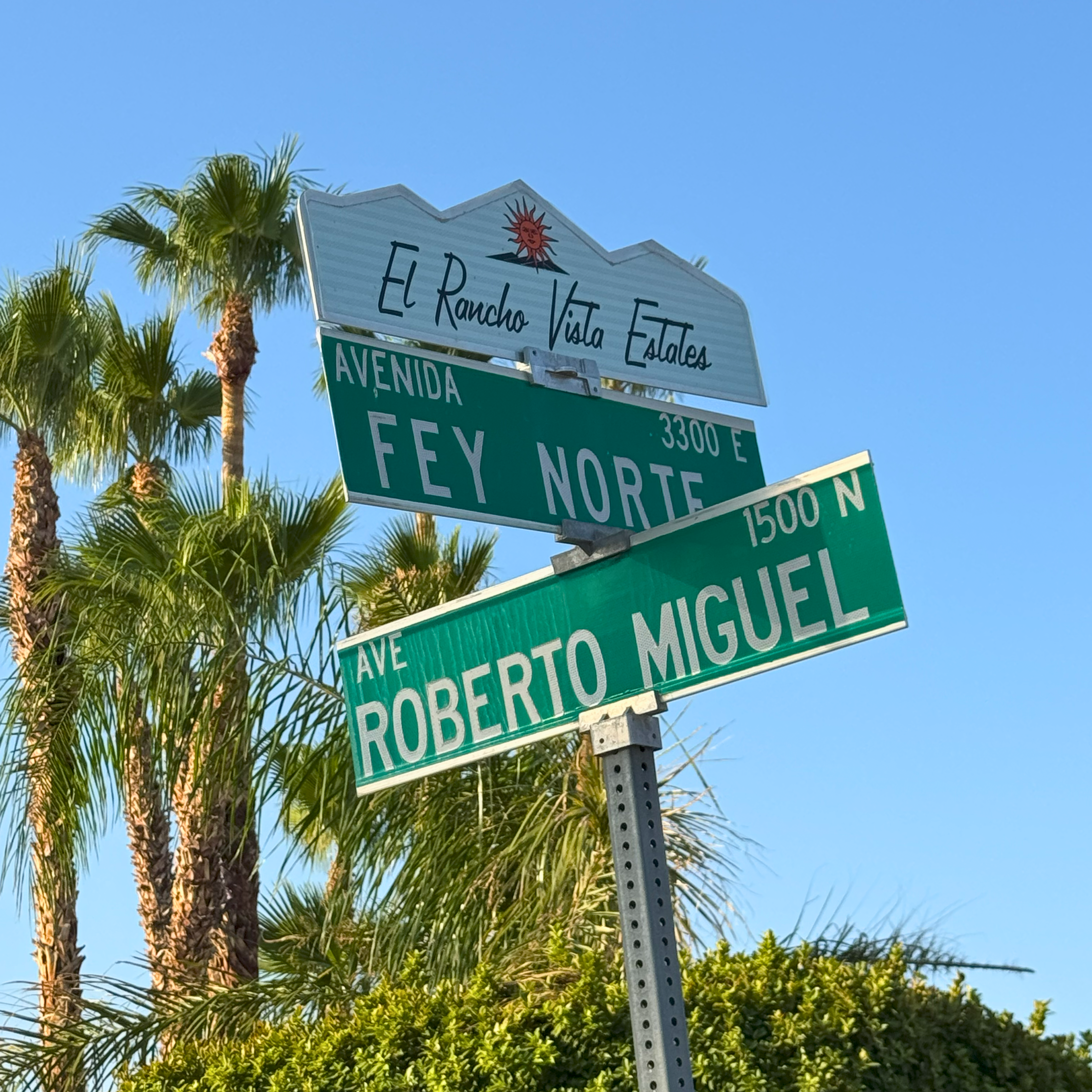
The neighborhood name appears above street signs in El Rancho Vista Estates as part of the city's "Blade" sign program

== History ==
El Rancho Vista Estates was developed by Roy Fey, a former Chicago accountant and builder who moved to Palm Springs in the mid-1950s, and was the first and only residential neighborhood designed by Wexler and Harrison.

The first phase of construction was completed between 1959 and 1960, producing around 70 homes using three basic floor plans: the Bermuda, the Capri, and the Casablanca, each featuring distinct layouts. Features included flat and butterfly roofs, down-turned eaves, floor-to-ceiling windows, and concrete block walls.

Fey partnered with Joe Koch to form Fey and Koch Construction for two subsequent phases that saw the development of an additional 40 ranch-style homes in the 1960s and 1970s, however those homes were not designed by Wexler and Harrison.

El Rancho Vista Estates Neighborhood Organization (ERVNO) is the legal entity that represents the neighborhood as part of ONE-PS, and advocates for the neighborhood’s preservation.

== Historic properties ==
El Rancho Vista Estates has one house that has been designated a Class 1 Historic site, and two other documented houses.

=== Class 1 Historic Resource status ===
==== Ratner Residence ====
The Ratner Residence, located at 1633 Via Roberto Miguel, is a single-family home designed by Wexler and Harrison in 1960 for Benjamin and Lee Ratner. The house is an example of the “Bermuda” model. Characteristic features include a low-pitched gable roof, decorative concrete block screens, clerestory windows, and floor-to-ceiling glass. In 2024, The City of Palm Springs designated the property as a Class 1 Historic Site.

=== Other noteworthy house ===
==== Barbie House ====
The "Barbie House" is associated with Mattel executive Louis Greenwald Sr., a relative of Ruth Mosko Handler, co-founder of Mattel.

==== Jack LaLanne House ====
Jack LaLanne, the fitness and nutrition pioneer, owned a home in the neighborhood, where, according to the Los Angeles Times, he occasionally filmed The Jack LaLanne Show.

== Preservation ==
Restoration efforts by residents, including John Lewis and Jane Steichen-Lewis, have been documented in Palm Springs Life and other publications, as have Ashley and Erik Rosenow, the former president of the Palm Springs Preservation Foundation.

== Notable residents ==
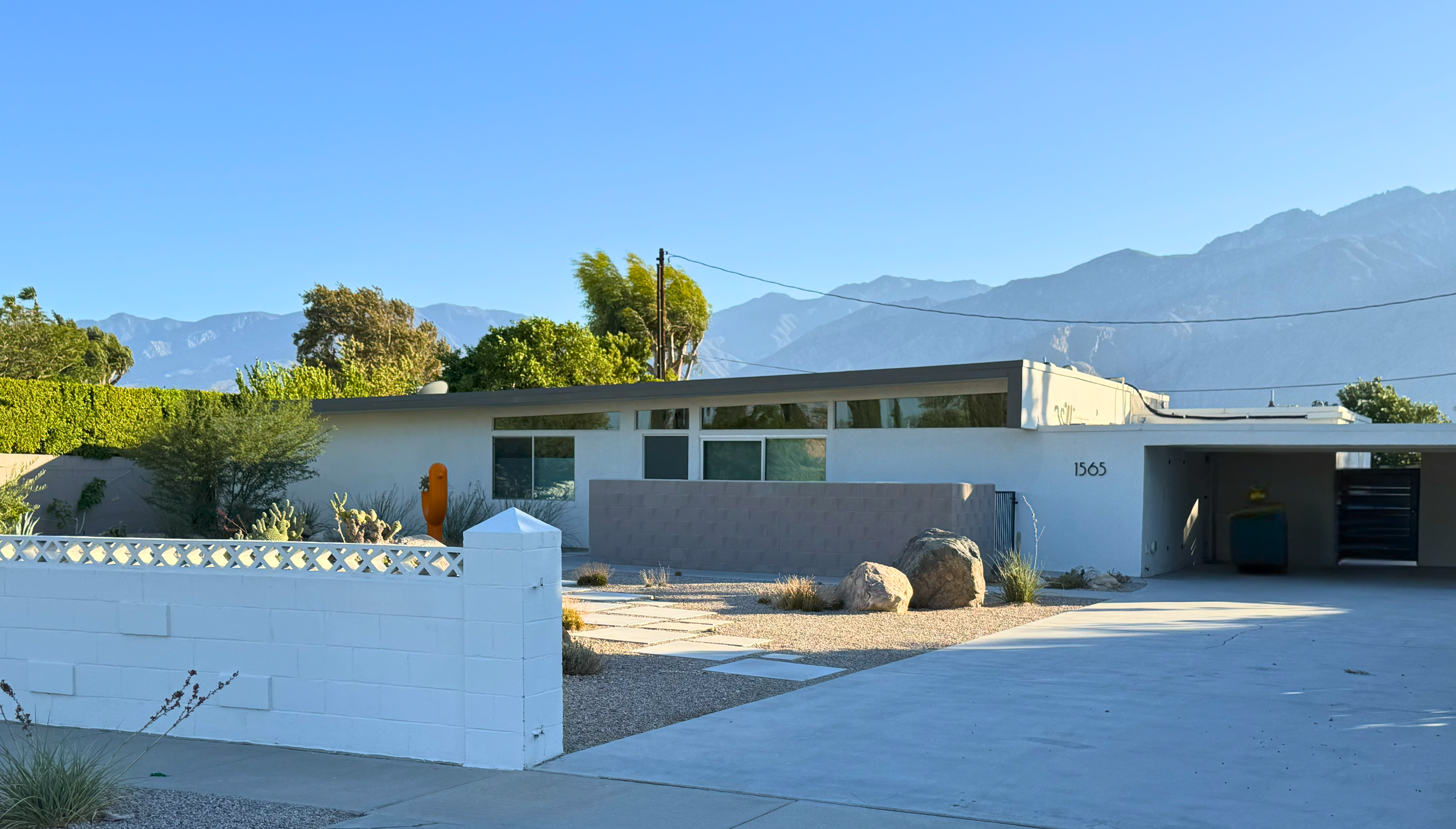
Jack LaLanne's house

Notable residents of El Rancho Vista Estates have included:

- Architect Richard Harrison.
- Fitness pioneer Jack LaLanne.
- Actor Andy Dick.

== Legacy and recognition ==
El Rancho Vista Estates is included in the Citywide Historic Context Statement as representative of mid-century modern development. Its homes have been documented in publications such as Atomic Ranch and preservation reports by the Palm Springs Preservation Foundation.

== See also ==
- El Rancho Vista Estates Neighborhood Organization
- Organized Neighborhoods of Palm Springs
- Palm Springs Office of Neighborhoods
