= Marilyn Forever Blonde =

2007 play by Greg Thompson

Marilyn Forever Blonde is a 2007 play about Marilyn Monroe written by Greg Thompson.

== About ==
Marilyn Forever Blonde.....The Marilyn Monroe Story In Her Own Words & Music is a one-woman play with music written by Greg Thompson and directed by Stephanie Shine. It takes place in a photographer's studio on what might be the last day of Marilyn's tumultuous life. The photographer and the many pivotal characters in Marilyn's life are heard but not seen.

== Tour and reception ==
The play opened in February 2007 at the Stella Adler Theatre in Hollywood with actress/singer Sunny Thompson as Marilyn Monroe. The play then began touring theatres throughout the United States, across Canada, New Zealand and England with a nine-week run in the West End Leicester Square Theatre. The play has received critical acclaim throughout its tour. The Boston Globe called it "BREATHTAKING," The L.A. Journal, "AMAZING!," The San Francisco Chronicle Online called it "One of the greatest performances of the modern stage".

== Awards ==
The play has won over a dozen regional theatre awards including "Best Theatrical Event of the Year" and "Best Actress" from the Dayton Daily News "Day-Tony" Awards, "Best Touring Show of the Year" from the Connecticut Critics Circle and the Lee Hartgrave "FAME AWARD" for "Best Acting".

== Songs ==
The play utilizes 17 songs that are interwoven with the dialogue, which is constructed entirely of documented quotes from Marilyn Monroe and pivotal characters from her personal life and career. The songs are all songs sung by Monroe in her films and include: "My Heart Belongs To Daddy," "I Want Be Loved By You," "Running Wild," "That Old Black Magic" and "Diamonds Are A Girl's Best Friend."
