= Los Cuñaos =

Eight-part vocal group from Caracas, Venezuela

- Origin: Venezuela
- Genres: Traditional, pop
- Years active: 1974–present
- Label: CBS–Columbia
- Members: Founding group Alí Agüero; José Ramón Angarita; Fanny Barrios; Ofelinda García; Carlos Moreán; Gonzalo Peña; Maricruz Quintero; Zenaida Riera; Others; Meiver Acuña; Germán Freytes; Luis Manuel Frómeta; Leonor Jove; Carlos Landáez; Franklin Mendoza; Elizabeth Quintanales; Candy Rojas; Edgar Salazar; José Sifontes; Daniel Somaroo; Emilio Solé

Los Cuñaos [coo-nyah'-os] is an eight-part vocal group established in Caracas, Venezuela in 1974. Their repertoire is based on popular Venezuelan songs adapted to their own unique style of singing, performing a crossover of traditional and pop genres while contrasting their work with rich and warm harmonies.

== History ==
The group was formed by musician Alí Agüero, who came to sing with the Onda Nueva group created and led by Aldemaro Romero. The Onda Nueva (New Wave) is a genre derived from the Venezuelan joropo and the Brazilian bossa nova, which has a few slight nods to jazz and classical music.

In essence, Los Cuñaos is a studio vocal group, as they are jingle singers, the core members of a fellowship that used to gather daily in recording studios to sing a short song or tune used in advertising and for other commercial uses. Individually, they are totally unknown to popular music listeners, even though their singing was heard day and night on television and radio across Venezuela. At the time, most of the top jingle singers in Venezuela drifted into the business from the pop music world.

Los Cuñaos made their first public appearance at Aula Magna of the Central University of Venezuela late in 1974. The group later toured Chile, Puerto Rico, Mexico and United States.

== Selected repertory ==
- Adios
- Alma llanera
- Ayúdame / Cuando no sé de ti / Te necesito / Ansiedad
- Barlovento / San Juan to' lo tiene
- Caballo viejo
- Canchunchú dichoso / Caramba
- Caracas / Cimarrón
- Carmen
- Carretera / Me gusta soñar
- Chucho y Ceferina
- Conde a Principal
- Crepúsculo coriano
- Dama antañona / Mujer merideña
- Danzas orientales / Maremare / El robalo / La burriquita
- El ausente / Brumas del mar
- El cumaco de San Juan / Mónica Pérez
- El muñeco de la ciudad / El carite
- El raspao'
- Esquina la Bolsa
- Fantasía criolla
- Flor de Mayo / Ahora
- Florentino y el Diablo
- La chipola
- La Ruperta / El perico / Préstame tu máquina
- Maracaibo en la noche / Pregones de la Plaza Baralt
- Maria Elena / Adios a Ocumare
- Niño lindo
- Olor a Navidad / Grey Zuliana
- Poco a poco
- Polo coriano
- Pueblos tristes
- Quinta Anauco / Y llueve todavía
- Quitapesares / Amándonos
- Ricciardi
- San Juan se va / Moliendo café
- Serenata
- Tu ternura / Anhelante
- Zumba que zumba

== Discography ==
| Year | Title | Label | Ref |
|---|---|---|---|
| 1974 | Los Cuñaos – Música Venezolana | CBS–Columbia | |
| 1975 | Los Cuñaos Volumen 2 | CBS–Columbia | |
| 1975 | Los Cuñaos Volumen 3 | CBS–Columbia | |
| 1976 | Los Cuñaos 4 | CBS–Columbia | |
| 1979 | Los Cuñaos 5 | CBS–Columbia | |
| 1981 | Los Cuñaos 6 | CBS–Columbia | |
| 1990 | Sabor Venezolano (compilation) | CBS–Columbia | |
