= Earl Greenburg =

- Born: January 6, 1947; Philadelphia, Pennsylvania
- Died: February 1, 2008 (aged 61); Palm Springs, California
- Occupation: TV producer
- Partner: David Peet
- Children: 3

Earl Greenburg (January 6, 1947 – February 1, 2008) was an American TV producer and former head of NBC Daytime.

== Early life and career ==
Born in Philadelphia, he moved to Los Angeles in 1977, where he was working as VP of the compliance and practices department at NBC when Brandon Tartikoff picked him as VP for daytime programming in 1981. He then worked as an independent TV producer for programs including The Regis Philbin Show, World's Wildest Police Videos and World's Scariest Police Chases. After he left, he served as president of Home Shopping Network (HSN) in Florida and later founded Transactional Marketing Partners (TMP). For his work with HSN, he became known as "The Prince of Infomercials".

== Death ==
On February 1, 2008, he died from melanoma. He was survived by his life partner David Peet, his son Ari Greenburg, daughter Meredith Greenburg, he and David Peet's daughter Kathryn Claire Peet-Greenburg, four grandchildren and two brothers.

In 2001, a Golden Palm Star on the Palm Springs, California, Walk of Stars was dedicated to Greenburg and in 2007, an additional star, was dedicated to Greenburg and his life partner, David Peet.
