= Richard Arnett Harrison =

American architect (1924–1995)

Richard Harrison
- Born: Richard Arnett Harrison; June 5, 1924; Los Angeles, California, U.S.
- Died: December 28, 1995 (aged 71); Palm Springs, California, U.S.
- Education: University of Southern California (B.Arch., 1951)
- Occupation: Architect
- Awards: Palm Springs Walk of Stars (2015)
- Projects: Palm Springs Spa Hotel; Steel Development Houses; Royal Hawaiian Estates; Seven Lakes Country Club

Richard Arnett Harrison, AIA, (June 5, 1924 – December 28, 1995) was an American architect best known for his contributions to mid-century modern architecture in Southern California. Based in Palm Springs, Harrison partnered with Donald Wexler in the 1950s–60s to form the firm Wexler & Harrison, which designed numerous homes, schools, and civic buildings exemplifying the Desert Modernism style. Notable projects by Harrison include the Palm Springs Spa Hotel (1958), the Steel Development Houses (1962), and Royal Hawaiian Estates condominiums (1960). He later designed Seven Lakes Country Club, a residential community in Palm Springs. In 2015, Harrison was posthumously honored with a star on the Palm Springs Walk of Stars.

== Early life and education ==
Richard Harrison was born in Los Angeles, California, on June 5, 1924. He attended University High School and served in the United States Army Air Forces during World War II before pursuing architecture. He graduated from the University of Southern California in 1951 with a Bachelor of Architecture degree cum laude. After graduation, he traveled through Mexico and Canada to broaden his design perspective.

== Career ==
In 1951, Harrison moved to the Coachella Valley and joined architect William Cody's office in Palm Springs. There he met Donald Wexler, a young architect formerly with Richard Neutra. By 1953, Harrison and Wexler established the firm Wexler & Harrison, which operated until 1961.

Wexler & Harrison were instrumental in shaping Desert Modernism, designing private homes, tract housing, and civic structures. They pioneered modular steel construction for public schools, later applying similar methods to their residential designs.

In 1960, the George Alexander Construction Company commissioned Wexler & Harrison to design the Steel Development Houses, affordable prefab homes for Racquet Club Estates. Rising steel prices limited production to seven homes, now internationally recognized examples of mid-century prefab design.

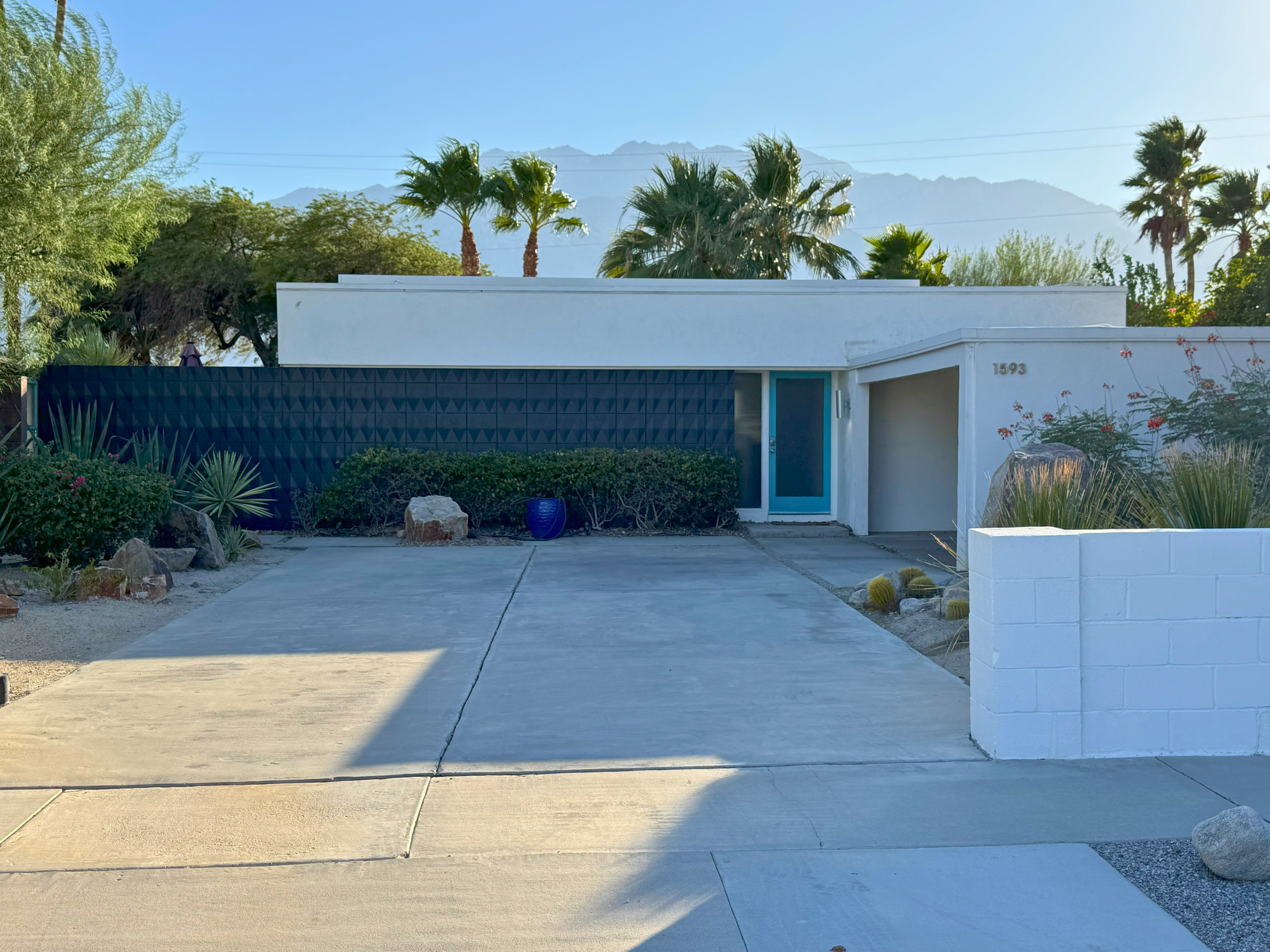
Harrison's home at 1593 Roberto Miguel, in El Rancho Vista Estates. Harrison lived in the community that he and Wexler built.

The firm’s residential projects include:

- The Joe and Joyce Pawling House I, aka Lilliana Gardens (1954)
- El Rancho Vista Estates (1959–1961), a tract of 75 homes developed by Roy Fey.
- Royal Hawaiian Estates (1960), a 40-unit Polynesian-themed condominium complex, Palm Springs' first Historic Residential District.
- Palm Springs Spa Hotel, co-designed with Cody and Phillip Koenig, opened in 1958.
- Shadow Mountain Club Fairway Cottages (early 1960s), a 54-unit modernist enclave in Palm Desert.
- Palm Springs Medical Clinic (1963) and other commercial buildings.

Wexler & Harrison are credited with designing the original Palm Springs International Airport terminal, completed in 1966 by Wexler’s firm.

After the partnership amicably dissolved in 1961, Harrison embarked on a solo career that saw him design notable residential communities and collaborate on major projects in the Coachella Valley and beyond. For instance, Seven Lakes Country Club in Palm Springs, a 120-acre gated community built 1964–1972 was designed by Harrison (with a clubhouse by William Cody). Harrison’s modernist design at Seven Lakes features low-slung single-story condo units (278 duplexes and 64 two-story condos) with patterned concrete block walls, floor-to-ceiling glass, atrium courtyards and floating rooflines. This development is often cited as a pioneering example of Desert Modernism that shifted Palm Springs from single-family homes to stylish condominium living.

During the 1960s, Harrison also collaborated with other leading architects. He worked alongside Howard Lapham on the Smoke Tree Village shopping center (opened 1965), as evidenced by a city historic assessment which notes the complex was designed by “Howard Lapham and Associates with Palm Springs architect Richard A. Harrison”. Harrison’s independent practice (sometimes under the name Financial Structures Associates) produced numerous banks, medical offices, and custom homes in the desert. For example, Harrison designed the Dr. Harry and Betty Garber Residence (1972) in Palm Springs’ exclusive Southridge. Contemporary preservation documents recognize Harrison as a “well-regarded local practitioner” who designed numerous notable buildings throughout the Coachella Valley – individually, in various partnerships, and in collaborations. His early-career associations include modernists William Cody and Donald Wexler, and by his contributions to mid-century “subdivisions, country clubs and commercial projects” in the desert.

== Modernist retrospectives and preservation efforts ==
Harrison’s work has been featured in modernist retrospectives, exhibitions, and preservation campaigns. In 2015, Modernism Week (Palm Springs’ annual mid-century architecture festival) dedicated a Walk of Stars ceremony to Harrison’s memory. At the dedication, colleagues and historians highlighted Harrison’s important role in Desert Modern design, including his contributions to the Wexler & Harrison partnership. Harrison’s name also appears in scholarly and preservation literature about Desert Modernism. He is noted, for example, in the Steel and Shade: The Architecture of Donald Wexler exhibition catalog for his part in the development of Wexler’s steel homes. Preservation organizations have championed several of Harrison’s joint projects for landmark status. The Royal Hawaiian Estates condominium complex became the city’s first residential historic district in 2010. The Polynesian-inspired Royal Hawaiian (40 units in 12 buildings) is celebrated in conservation circles as a prime example of “tiki” modernism. The Palm Springs Preservation Foundation’s archives document Harrison’s work on Royal Hawaiian Estates and other subdivisions, underscoring his significance in the Desert Polynesia tiki-modern trend of the early ’60s.

Similarly, the Canyon Country Club (now Indian Canyons) development in south Palm Springs highlights Harrison’s contributions. The master-planned golf community opened in 1962, with its "iconic modernist clubhouse designed by Donald Wexler and Richard Harrison". The clubhouse (part of Palm Springs’ first 18-hole golf course) and the surrounding high-end homes are now a focus of neighborhood historic tours. These preservation and educational efforts routinely cite Harrison’s name alongside his contemporaries.

== Later career and legacy ==
From 1964 to 1972, Harrison served as lead architect for Seven Lakes Country Club in Palm Springs, a 278-unit modernist golf course community. William Cody designed the clubhouse. Seven Lakes is noted for its low-slung homes, decorative block, and glass walls. President Dwight D. Eisenhower famously scored a hole-in-one there in 1968.

Harrison designed additional homes in Nevada and the Southwest during the 1970s. He died on December 28, 1995, in Palm Springs. On October 23, 1999, he received a Golden Palm Star on the Palm Springs Walk of Stars.

== Notable works ==
- Palm Springs Spa Hotel and Bath House (1958–60): A landmark modernist resort co-designed by Donald Wexler, Richard Harrison and William Cody (with Phillip Koenig). The Spa Bath House’s elegant colonnade and “flying wedge” roof were a product of this collaboration. Wallpaper magazine notes that the “1959 spa and casino complex designed by William Cody, Donald Wexler, Richard Harrison and Phillip Koenig” stood as a mid-century icon until its 2014 demolition.
- El Rancho Vista Estates (1959–61): A mid-century modern tract in Palm Springs, the first residential subdivision by Wexler & Harrison. Developers Roy and Bob Fey hired the duo to design roughly 70 affordable modern homes with open-plan layouts, distinctive folded plate rooflines, and extensive glass. Modernism Week and local historians emphasize this tract’s significance – “From 1959-1961, the firm Wexler-Harrison designed approximately 70 homes in El Rancho Vista Estates…” – and note that Harrison himself chose to live in one of the homes he designed.
- Royal Hawaiian Estates (1960): A Polynesian-themed modernist condo complex in south Palm Springs, designed by the firm of Wexler & Harrison in 1960. Comprising 40 units in 12 buildings, it features dramatic “tiki” elements (upswept flying sevens roof ornaments and A-frame tiki apexes). Preservation sources credit Wexler & Harrison as architects and highlight that Royal Hawaiian Estates became Palm Springs’ first historic district due to its architectural value. Harrison’s role is preserved in mid-century archives; e.g. CA Modern magazine and Desert Sun reports covered RHE’s historic designation.
- Shadow Mountain Club Fairway Cottages (1961–63): A cluster of modern golf cottages in Palm Desert associated with the Shadow Mountain Club resort. Harrison is identified as the architect of these mid-century “Fairway Cottages.” The Historical Society of Palm Desert notes a “1961 Richard Harrison Fairway Cottage” restored to its original vibe, indicating Harrison’s design authorship. The fairway villas exemplify the extension of Desert Modernism into country club settings in the early ’60s.
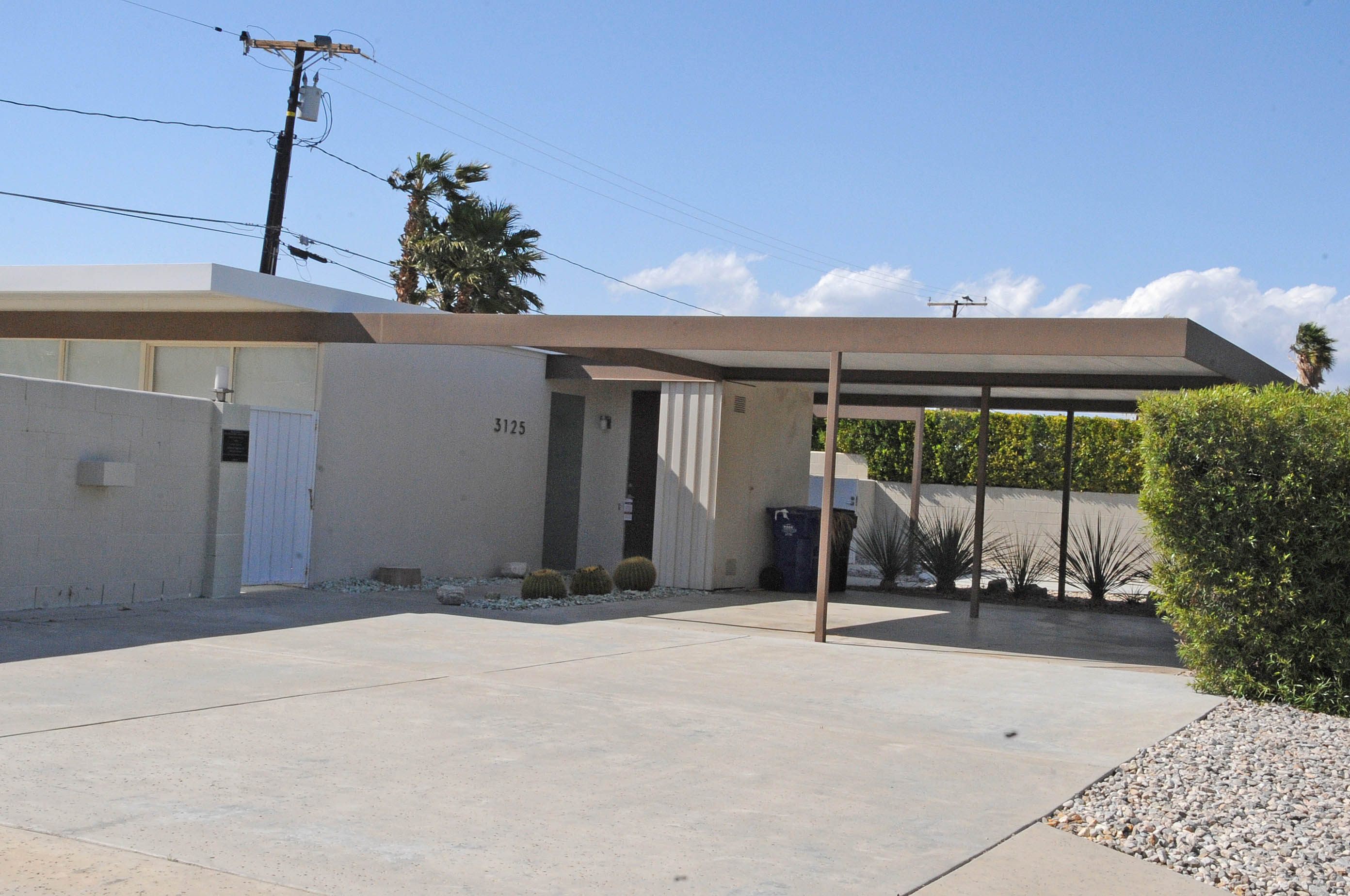
- Steel Development House 2
  Steel Development Houses (1961-62): Perhaps Harrison’s most famous work with Wexler, this was a groundbreaking project of all-steel prefabricated homes. In 1960 the George Alexander Construction Company commissioned Wexler & Harrison to design a tract of 38 steel homes for Palm Springs’ Racquet Club Estates. Rising steel costs halted the project after just seven houses were built, but those seven are now internationally acclaimed icons of prefab design. The steel homes, erected in days with factory-made panels, have eight-foot glass walls and innovative lightweight frames. One model even landed on the National Register of Historic Places for demonstrating “the possibilities for rapidly assembled and affordable homes for the middle class”. A recent Docomomo US research article revealed that Harrison and Wexler also designed an “eighth” steel house in Las Vegas (the 1962 Hammond Steel Home), built for CalCor steel dealer Merrill Hammond. Donald Wexler himself confirmed the Vegas house as one of their designs, meaning Harrison’s steel house legacy extends beyond Palm Springs.
- Palm Springs International Airport terminal (1966): The original main terminal of the city’s airport was a Wexler-led project in the mid-1960s, reflecting the influence of the Wexler & Harrison school of design. Wexler’s soaring, tensile roof design for the airport’s open-air hall is a Midcentury Modern showpiece. Contemporary sources attribute the airport to Donald Wexler (1965). Harrison’s direct involvement is unclear, as it was built after he went solo; however, the project’s style and timeframe closely follow the Wexler & Harrison collaborative period. Both architects were Palm Springs residents and members of the American Institute of Architects, active in that era.
- Canyon Country Club Estates (early 1960s): Harrison’s last major collaboration with Wexler was the master-planning of the Canyon Country Club (now Indian Canyons Golf Resort) in south Palm Springs. They co-designed the modernist clubhouse, which opened with the new 18-hole course in October 1962. The clubhouse’s striking desert modern design – low horizontal lines, a dramatic stone facade, and integration with the mountain vistas – drew celebrities to the grand opening. The Indian Canyons neighborhood organization confirms “famed architects Donald Wexler and Richard Harrison designed its iconic clubhouse”. Harrison’s and Wexler’s plan for the surrounding development included high-end homes and condos (some by other architects like Stan Sackley and William Krisel) that established the area as a coveted mid-century enclave. Today, the restored clubhouse and neighborhood are frequently studied as an example of Mid-Century Modern planning, with Harrison acknowledged for his role in its creation.
