= Sunny Thompson =

American singer

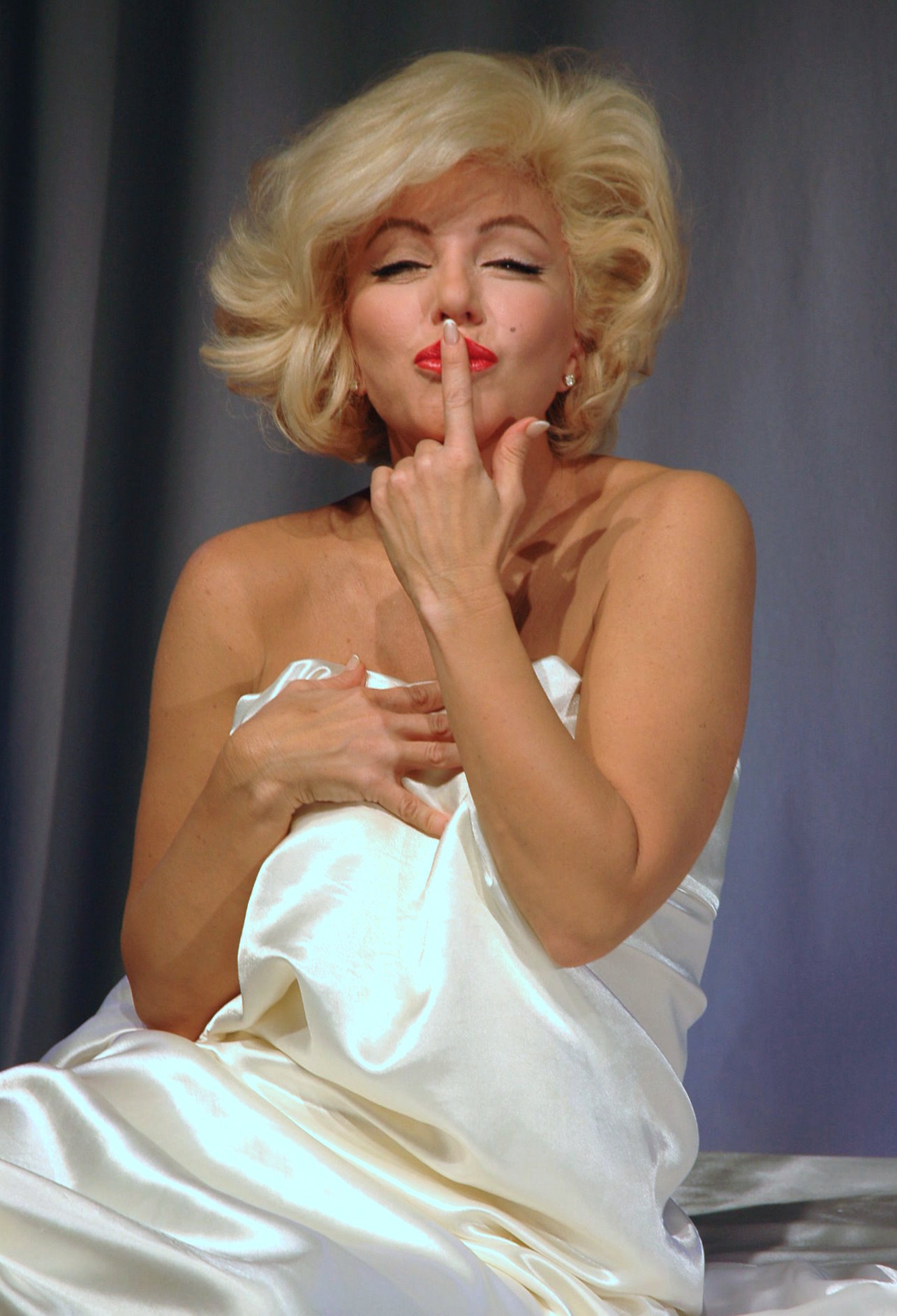
- Entertainer
- Born: Grand Rapids, Minnesota
- Occupation: Star of "Marilyn Forever Blonde!"
- Spouse: Greg Thompson
- Website: http://marilynforeverblonde.com

Sunny Thompson is an American singer, actress and recording artist best known for her portrayal of Marilyn Monroe in the critically acclaimed, award-winning one-woman show “Marilyn Forever Blonde, The Marilyn Monroe Story In Her Own Words & Music.” She has recorded several albums, one of which, "Te Necesito," earned her a gold record in South America.

The Minnesota native began singing in church as a child and studied opera at Concordia College in Moorhead, Minnesota, before pursuing a career as an actress, singer, dancer, and comedian.

She has starred in musical theater and in many major showrooms throughout the world including the HBO feature "Showgirls" at the Rio Hotel & Casino in Paradise, Nevada. She has appeared in her award-winning cabaret shows in major casino showrooms in Reno, Lake Tahoe, Laughlin, Tunica and San Diego as well as Las Vegas. From 1996 through 2000 she starred in the "Great American Wild, Wild West Show" in her own theatre in Branson, Missouri.

Thompson has starred in the children's television series "Wonder World" in Minneapolis, had her own radio show, "The Branson Minute," syndicated on 79 radio stations throughout the country.

Sunny stars in the documentary film, "Becoming Marilyn Monroe" (Lipstick Productions, 2018) which covers the creation, rehearsal and ten-year tour that took "Marilyn Forever Blonde" all over the world. The film's World Premiere was in Palm Springs, California at "The American Documentary Film Festival" on April 10, 2018. The documentary was sold out and held over by popular demand, winning every award at the film festival. "Becoming Marilyn Monroe" will continue to have screenings at film festivals worldwide.

In 2019, Sunny was awarded a Star on the Palm Springs Walk of Stars beside that of Marilyn Monroe.
