= Alexander Construction Company =

Residential developer in the Palm Springs area

- Industry: Construction
- Founder: George and Robert Alexander
- Defunct: 1965
- Headquarters: Palm Springs, California

Alexander Construction Company was a Palm Springs, California, residential development company that built over 2,200 houses in the Coachella Valley of Riverside County, California, between 1955 and 1965.

This construction doubled the size of Palm Springs and caused the city to take on a new shape, direction, and character as an enclave of modern architecture in the Mid-century modern style. These houses, collectively known as "Alexanders," are known for their rational designs, modernist style, and innovative construction and are now highly sought after, selling for a premium over their more conventional contemporaries.

== History ==
Robert Alexander and George Alexander of the Alexander Construction Company

The company was founded by George Alexander and his son Robert, building starter houses of 1,200 square feet (110 m^{2}) priced moderately at $19,500 in south Palm Springs, a location at that time not considered fashionable. Each new development was increasingly ambitious, adding amenities and square footage. By the end of the 1950s, the Alexanders were building in northwest Palm Springs, traditionally the haven of the wealthy and "Old Hollywood" crowd. Joseph C. Dunas was an equal partner with the Alexanders when they built the Twin Palms tract and the Ocotillo Lodge Hotel as well as many other "Alexanders." Alexander, his son, daughter in law and wife perished in a plane crash leaving Palm Springs for Los Angeles.

=== Projects ===
Many of these later houses exceeded 2,000 square feet (200 m^{2}), with the largest adding another 600 square feet (56 m^{2}). A swimming pool was included in all of these designs, priced then from the high $40,000s to the low $50,000s. The neighborhood, known today as Las Palmas, became the neighborhood of choice for the "New Hollywood" crowd seeking weekend Colorado Desert escapes. Dinah Shore, Darren McGavin, Dean Martin, Joan Collins, Marilyn Monroe, and Harold Robbins each owned an "Alexander." Frank Sinatra's home by E. Stewart Williams is nearby. Nancy Sinatra still lives in the neighborhood.

The majority of Alexander homes were designed by architects Dan Palmer and William Krisel, of Palmer & Krisel. Exceptions include those with an A-frame facade, known as "Swiss Misses", and homes in the Green Fairway Estates tract in south Palm Springs. The Green Fairway Estates in Palm Springs were designed by Donald Wexler, architect of the Palm Springs International Airport.

=== Publicized projects ===
The most well-known Alexander house in Las Palmas is the Lawford/Kennedy house, originally built for Peter Lawford, connected by marriage to the Kennedy family and a charter member of the Rat Pack. During a visit to Palm Springs, President Kennedy was to have stayed at Sinatra's house, but ended up at Lawford's instead. The proximity of Lawford's house to Marilyn Monroe's supposedly gave rise to a rendezvous between JFK and Monroe.

Another well-known Alexander is the "Honeymoon Hideaway" at 1350 Ladera Circle, built by Robert Alexander for his wife in the early 1960s. The house and the Alexanders achieved some level of national celebrity when an eight-page article featuring the house and the family appeared in Look magazine in September 1962. The article portrayed the Alexanders and their estate as the center of social activities in Palm Springs in the early 1960s.

== Closure ==
George Alexander and his wife Mildred, along with their son Robert and his wife Helene, were killed on November 14, 1965, when their chartered plane flying from Palm Springs to Burbank crashed into the Little Chocolate Mountains near Indio, California. Also on board were Richard Koret, a handbag manufacturer and Peter Prescott, the 11-year-old son of Bob Prescott, the founder and president of The Flying Tiger Line.

The Alexander Construction Company ceased operations with the deaths of its principals.

== Alexander developments ==
- Araby Estates
- Desert Lanai 1,2,3,4
- Green Fairway Estates, Palm Springs, California
- Golf Club Estates
- Farrell Canyon Estates
- Indian Wells Village
- New Riviera Gardens
- Racquet Club Road Estates
  - Model home located at 289 Racquet Club Road
- Ramon Rise Estates (now known as Little Beverly Hills) - Marketed as Enchanted Village (64 of the 84 homes in the tract)
  - Model home located at 640 Compadre Road
- Sunmor Estates (marketed at Enchanted Homes)
  - Model home located at 2866 E Livmor Ave
  - Additional model home was built at 212 N Sunset Way in an additional Enchanted Homes tracts (now located in Sunrise Park neighborhood)
- Steel development houses by Donald Wexler near Simms and Sunnyview (7 homes)
- Twin Palms
  - No model home built. Instead, a sales office was built on East Palm Canyon Road with a pool. The sales office was later torn down but the pool remains today as the private pool of the Alexander Residence in Ocotillo Lodge.
- Vista Las Palmas
  - Golden Vista Estates model home located at 963 Via Monte Vista
  - Vista Last Palmas Estates model home located at 1215 N Vía Paraiso
- Fountain Lanai Apartments, West Hollywood, California
- Sunset Lanai Apartments, West Hollywood, California
