= Donald Wexler =

Mid-Century modern architect

- Born: Donald Allan Wexler; January 23, 1926; Sioux Falls, South Dakota, US
- Died: June 26, 2015 (aged 89); Palm Desert, California, US
- Education: University of Minnesota
- Occupation: Architect
- Spouses: Marilynn Dawn “Lynn” Maidman (m. 1953; died 1988); Nancy Lou Unterman (m. 1991; died 2007)
- Children: 3
- Buildings: Desert Water Agency, Palm Springs, California; Dinah Shore Residence, Palm Springs, California; El Rancho Vista Estates, Palm Springs, California; Larson Justice Center, Indio, California; Merrill Lynch Building, Palm Springs, California; Palm Springs International Airport, Palm Springs, California; Royal Hawaiian Estates, Palm Springs, California; Steel Development Houses, Palm Springs, California

Donald Allen Wexler, FAIA, (January 23, 1926 – June 26, 2015) was an American architect known for his work in Mid-Century modern architecture whose work is predominantly in the Palm Springs, California area. He is known for having pioneered the use of steel in residential design.

== Early life and education ==
Wexler was born in Sioux Falls, South Dakota, in 1926 and raised in Minneapolis, Minnesota. He served in the United States Navy during World War II from 1944 to 1946. Following his service, he attended the University of Minnesota, graduating with a Bachelor of Architecture degree in 1950, funded through the G.I. Bill.

== Career ==
=== Early career ===
After graduation, Wexler worked briefly for the renowned architect Richard Neutra in Los Angeles, CA. He moved to Palm Springs in 1952 to work with architect William Cody, further immersing himself in the emerging Desert Modernism movement.

=== Wexler & Harrison (1952–1961) ===
Later in 1952, Wexler established a partnership with Richard A. Harrison, forming the firm Wexler & Harrison. The firm was responsible for numerous schools, civic buildings, and residential projects across the Coachella Valley.

One of their most notable collaborations was the Steel Development Houses (1961–1962), a series of seven prefabricated homes in Palm Springs built in partnership with the Alexander Construction Company, US Steel, and architect Bernard Perlin. The project aimed to produce 38 all-steel houses but was curtailed due to escalating steel costs. These homes featured light-gauge steel framing, prefabricated panels, and open-plan designs that maximized natural light and indoor-outdoor flow.

=== Donald A. Wexler Associates (1963–2000) ===
Following the end of his partnership with Harrison, Wexler founded Donald A. Wexler Associates in 1963. His solo career was marked by several landmark designs:

- Palm Springs International Airport Terminal (1966): Designed with Charles Luckman and Associates, the airport features a tensile steel roof and minimalist modernist forms.
- Dinah Shore Residence (1964): A steel-and-glass private home in Palm Springs later purchased by actor Leonardo DiCaprio.
- Merrill Lynch Building (1971): A New Formalist commercial building characterized by steel framing, concrete block facades, and solar bronze glass.

Wexler's practice was intentionally small and regionally focused. His firm merged with WWCOT in 2000, which was later acquired by DLR Group.

== Architectural style and philosophy ==
Wexler's work emphasized light-gauge steel construction, flat roofs, deep overhangs, and expansive glass walls, embodying the principles of Mid-Century Modernism. His designs sought to integrate architecture with the desert environment, providing climate-resilient structures that facilitated indoor-outdoor living.

== Publications and legacy ==
A one time resident of Palm Springs, Wexler had a Golden Palm Star on the Palm Springs Walk of Stars dedicated to him in 2008. Wexler's architectural legacy is preserved in his archives housed at the Cal Poly Pomona College of Environmental Design. In 2011, the Palm Springs Art Museum organized the exhibition "Steel and Shade: The Architecture of Donald Wexler".

He was the subject of the 2009 documentary Journeyman Architect: The Life and Work of Donald Wexler.

In 2011, developer Marnie McBryde presented plans to build up to 50 Wexler-designed houses, which are adaptations of the 1964 Palm Springs house he designed for Dinah Shore, throughout the Hamptons. In 2014, actor Leonardo DiCaprio purchased the original Dinah Shore residence in the Old Las Palmas neighborhood of Palm Springs for $5,230,000 (equivalent to $7,110,000 in 2025).

== Selected works ==
- El Rancho Vista Estates (1959–1962), Palm Springs, CA
- Steel Development Houses (1961–1962), Palm Springs, CA
- Dinah Shore Residence (1964), Palm Springs, CA
- Palm Springs International Airport Terminal (1966), Palm Springs, CA
- Merrill Lynch Building (1971), Palm Springs, CA
- Royal Hawaiian Estates (1960), Palm Springs, CA

== Awards and honors ==
- Fellow of the American Institute of Architects (FAIA), 2004.
- Golden Palm Star on the Palm Springs Walk of Stars, 2008.
- Retrospective exhibition Steel and Shade: The Architecture of Donald Wexler, Palm Springs Art Museum, 2011.

== Personal life ==
Wexler married twice. He was the father of three sons, Glen Wexler, Gary Wexler, and Brian Wexler. Wexler lived in the Coachella Valley for nearly six decades, residing in Palm Desert, California, at the time of his death on June 26, 2015, at the age of 89.
