= William Krisel =

American architect

- Born: November 24, 1924; Shanghai, China
- Died: June 5, 2017 (aged 92); Beverly Hills, California, United States
- Education: University of Southern California
- Occupation: Architect
- Practice: Palmer & Krisel

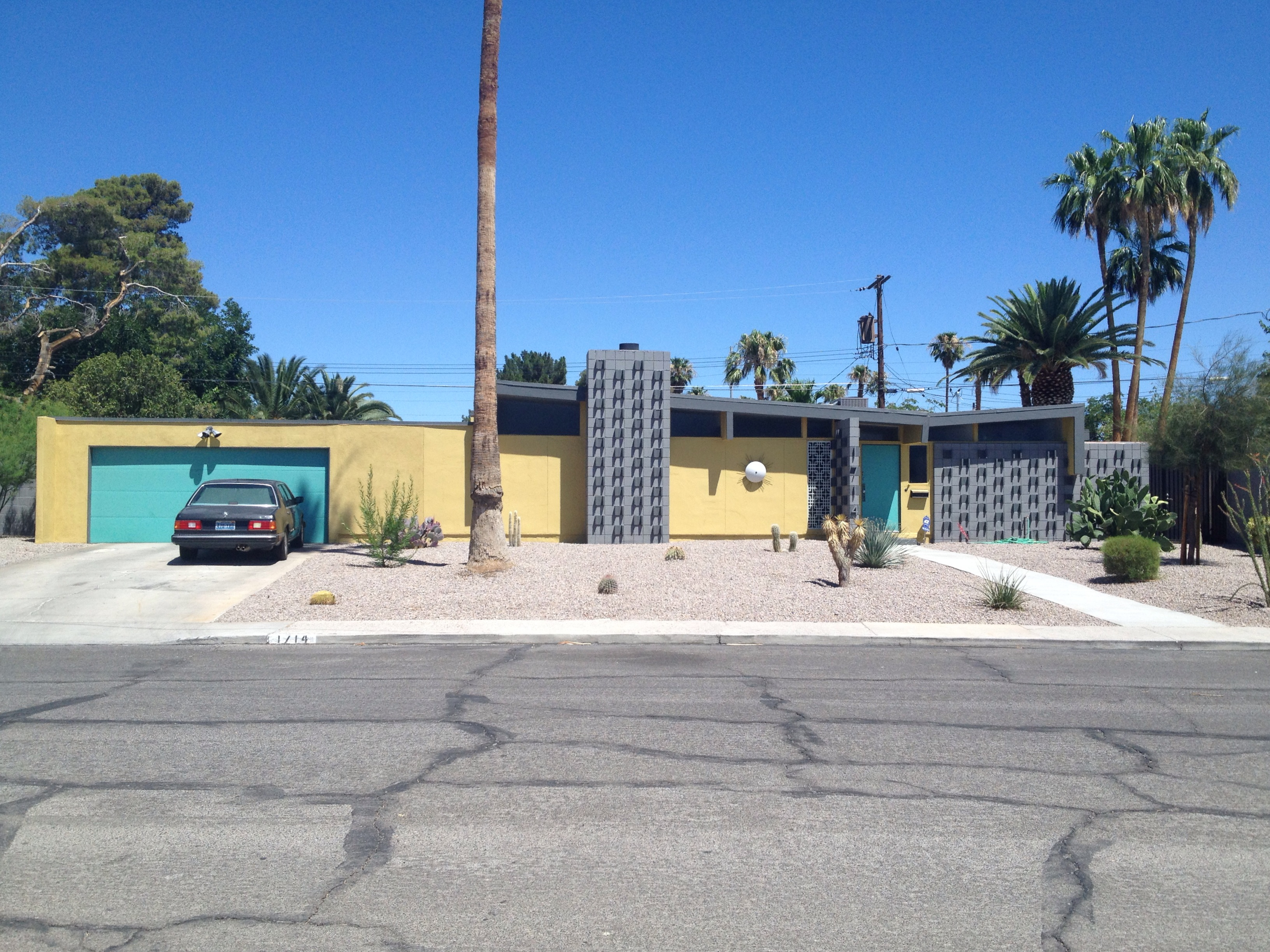
A William Krisel-designed home featuring a distinctive butterfly roof in Paradise Palms in Las Vegas, Nevada

William Krisel (November 14, 1924 – June 5, 2017) was an American architect best known for his pioneering designs of mid-century residential and commercial architecture. Most of his designs are for affordable homes, especially tract housing, with a modern aesthetic.

== Early life and education ==
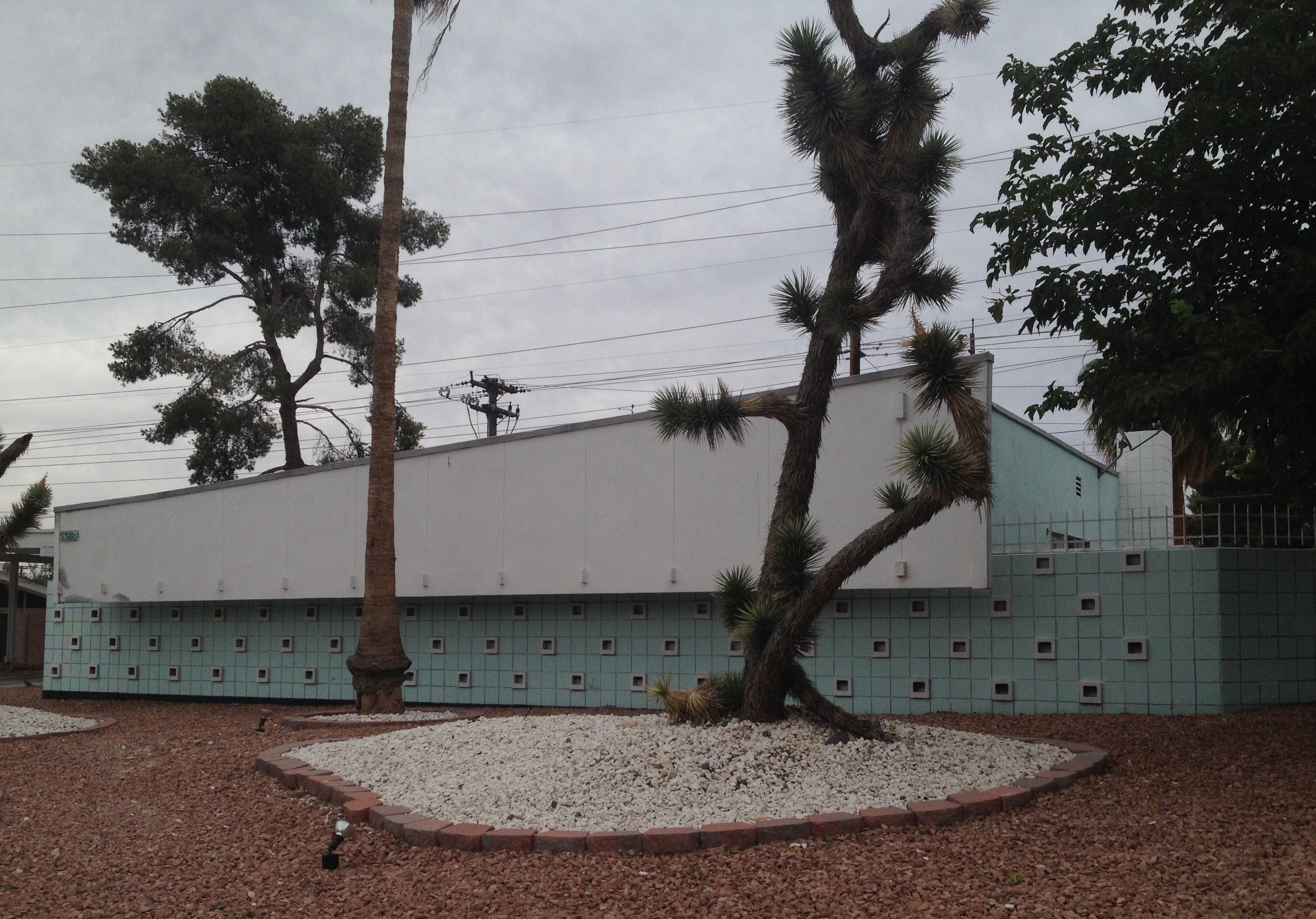
William Krisel House in Paradise Palms, Las Vegas

Krisel was born in 1924 in Shanghai, China. He moved with his American parents to Beverly Hills, California, in 1937. His father worked as a distributor for United Artists in and brought the family back to the United States after the outbreak of the Second Sino-Japanese War He returned to China during WWII, acting as an interpreter.

He attended the University of Southern California and graduated in 1949.

== Career ==
With Dan Palmer, Krisel formed Palmer & Krisel architects. Krisel designed more than 30,000 homes throughout Southern California; the total number of houses and condominiums designed by the firm probably exceeds 40,000. He frequently collaborated with the Alexander Construction Company. By the late 1950s, he and Palmer were working with seven out of the 10 largest homebuilders in America. In addition to Palm Springs, Los Angeles, and San Diego, and Indian Wells, California large tracts of homes designed by the firm were built in Las Vegas, Florida, and Arizona.

In the 1950s Krisel helped to nearly double the size of Palm Springs by building 2,500 tract homes that still exist today. Beginning in 1956 with their first Palm Springs tract, Twin Palms, Krisel, the firm's lead designer for desert houses, used variation of orientation and roofline, integration of indoor and outdoor living, and careful use of standardized elements to make modernist design affordable. The houses facilitated indoor-outdoor living in the desert with sheltered patios and pools and in some cases breezeways; clerestory windows improved air circulation while bringing light into the house. The interior designs included flexible room dividers to adapt the floorplan to the owners' preferences.

Krisel designed the iconic Del Prado condominium tower on Balboa Park for San Diego developer Bill Starr.

Del Prado Condominiums, Balboa Park, San Diego.

Krisel was a member of American Institute of Architects.

== Works ==
Krisel's works include

- 1950, Adolphe Stelzer House, Brentwood, California (demolished)
- 1951, Florence Hawkins Residence, Los Angeles, California
- 1951, Gina Janns House, Los Angeles, California
- 1952, Martha Hyer House, 8688 Hollywood Boulevard, Los Angeles, California.
- 1953, Tampa Homes (Housing Tract) Reseda, California.
- 1953, Parkwood Covina (Housing Tract) West Covina, California
- 1954, Garden Grove North (Housing Tract) Garden Grove, California
- 1955, Garden Grove East (Housing Tract) Garden Grove, California
- 1955, Krisel House, Brentwood, California (demolished)
- 1955, Corbin Palms (Housing Tract) San Fernando Valley, California
- 1956–1958, Twin Palms Estates (Housing Tract) Palm Springs, California
- 1957, Sundberg Residence, Van Nuys, California
- 1957, Ocotillo Lodge Hotel, Palm Springs, California
- 1957–1958, Ramon Rise Estates (Housing Tract) Palm Springs, California
- 1958, Tamarisk Ranchos, (Condominiums) Rancho Mirage, California
- 1958–1962, Racquet Club Estates, Palm Springs, California
- 1958–1965, Sandpiper Condominiums, Palm Desert, California
- 1958, Coffee Dan's Coffee Shop, Los Angeles, California
- 1959, College Glen Estates (Housing Tract) San Diego, California
- 1959, Raffee's Carpets, San Diego, California
- 1959, Lionel Krisel House, Los Angeles, California
- 1959, Borrego Gold Club Estates (Housing Tract) Borrego Springs, California
- 1959, La Jolla Scenic Heights (Housing Tract) San Diego, California
- 1959, Proposed Development, Yuma, Arizona (unbuilt)
- 1959, Housing Tract, Phoenix, Arizona (unbuilt)
- 1959–1960, Flair Homes (Housing Tract) Tucson, Arizona
- 1960, Alexander House (The House of Tomorrow), Palm Springs, California
- 1960–1964, Paradise Palms (Housing Tract) Las Vegas, Nevada
- 1960, 135 West Magnolia Boulevard, Burbank, California
- 1960, Loma Lodge, San Diego, California
- 1960, Loma Starr Building, San Diego, California (now Peninsula Center)
- 1960, Poway Plaza Shopping Center, Poway, San Diego, California
- 1960, Security First National Bank, Poway, San Diego, California
- 1960, PM Electronics, Poway, San Diego, California (unbuilt)
- 1960, University City (Housing Tract) San Diego, California
- 1960–1962, Viewpoint North (Housing Tract) San Diego, California
- 1960–1962, Viewpoint South (Housing Tract) San Diego, California
- 1961, Airport Reproduction Services, Midway District, San Diego, California
- 1961, Beth Israel School of Religion, San Diego, California
- 1961, Raffee's Carpets – Point Loma, San Diego, California
- 1961, Brandon Plaza Apartments, West Hollywood, California
- 1961, Crestmont Hills (Housing Tract) El Paso, Texas
- 1961–1966, Canyon View Estates (Housing Tract) Palm Springs, California
- 1962, Bankers Hill Apartments, San Diego, California
- 1962, Chamber Building, San Diego, California
- 1962, Private Residence, Marion Estates, Phoenix, Arizona
- 1962, Circle 8 1/2 Motel, Mission Valley, San Diego, California
- 1962 Point Loma Estates (Housing Tract) San Diego, California
- 1962 Park Lido (Town Home Complex) Newport Beach, California
- 1963, Kemp House, Palm Desert, California
- 1963, 9255 Sunset Boulevard, West Hollywood, California
- 1963–1964, Point Loma Towers Apartments, San Diego, California
- 1964, Point Loma Shopping Center, San Diego, California
- 1964, Black Mountain Estates, Henderson, Nevada
- 1964, Native Oasis Villas at Indian Wells Country Club, California
- 1964, West Loma Office Building, San Diego, California
- 1967, Shorepoint Apartments, San Diego, California
- 1968, Grundt-Tipper House, Palm Springs, California
- 1968, Canyon Lake Development, Riverside County, California
- 1968–1970, Kings Point Development, Palm Springs, California
- 1969–1979, Coronado Shores Condominiums, Coronado, California
- 1970, Marina Tower Apartments, Vallejo, California
- 1970, Harbour Lights Apartments, Huntington Beach, California
- 1972, Del Prado Condominiums, San Diego, California
- 1973, Ocean Towers, Santa Monica, California
- 1976, Fidelity Federal Savings and Loan Building, Glendale, California (now US Bank)
- 1981, Boca Monica Condos, Santa Monica, California
- 1981, 1033 Ocean Ave Condos, Santa Monica, California
- Circa 1981, Park Plaza Condos, Santa Monica, California
- 2006, Butterfly Homes, Palm Springs, California

== Death and archives ==
Krisel died June 5, 2017, at his home in Beverly Hills. He was 92.

The Getty Research Institute houses the William Krisel papers, 1935–2014.

== Further information ==
- William Krisel, Architect (2010)
- Menrad, Chris; Creighton, Heidi, eds. (2016). William Krisel's Palm Springs: The Language of Modernism. Layton, Utah: Gibbs Smith. ISBN 9781423642329.
