= List of public art in Palm Springs, California =

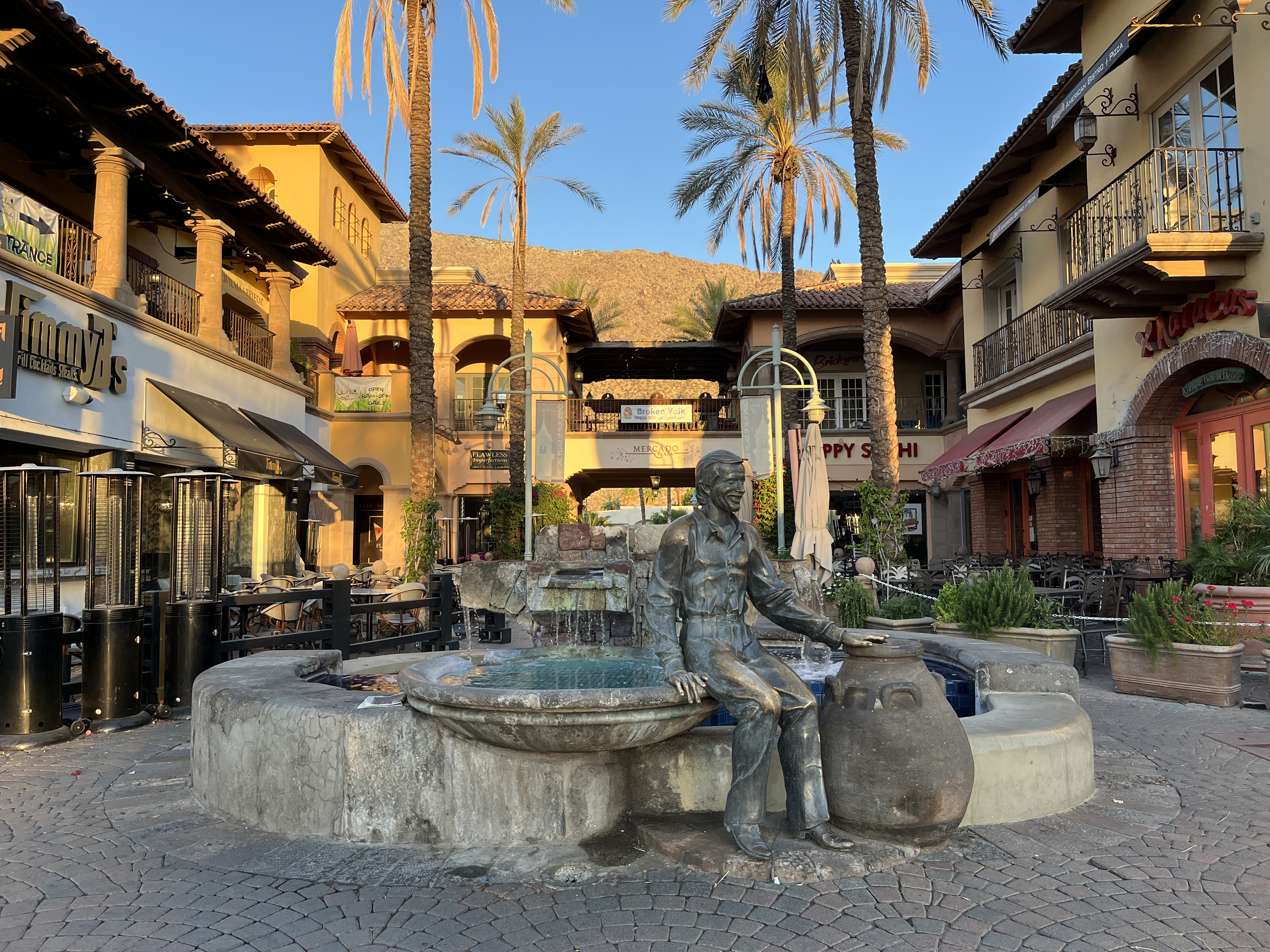
Statue of Sonny Bono

The city of Palm Springs, California has an extension public art collection. In 2020, Thrillist said, "Modern public art is everywhere in Palm Springs, from artist David Černý’s unsettling Babies installation to Instagrammer-baiting angel wings, stunning murals, sculptures, and even 40 art benches curated by The Palm Springs Public Arts Commission."

== List of works ==
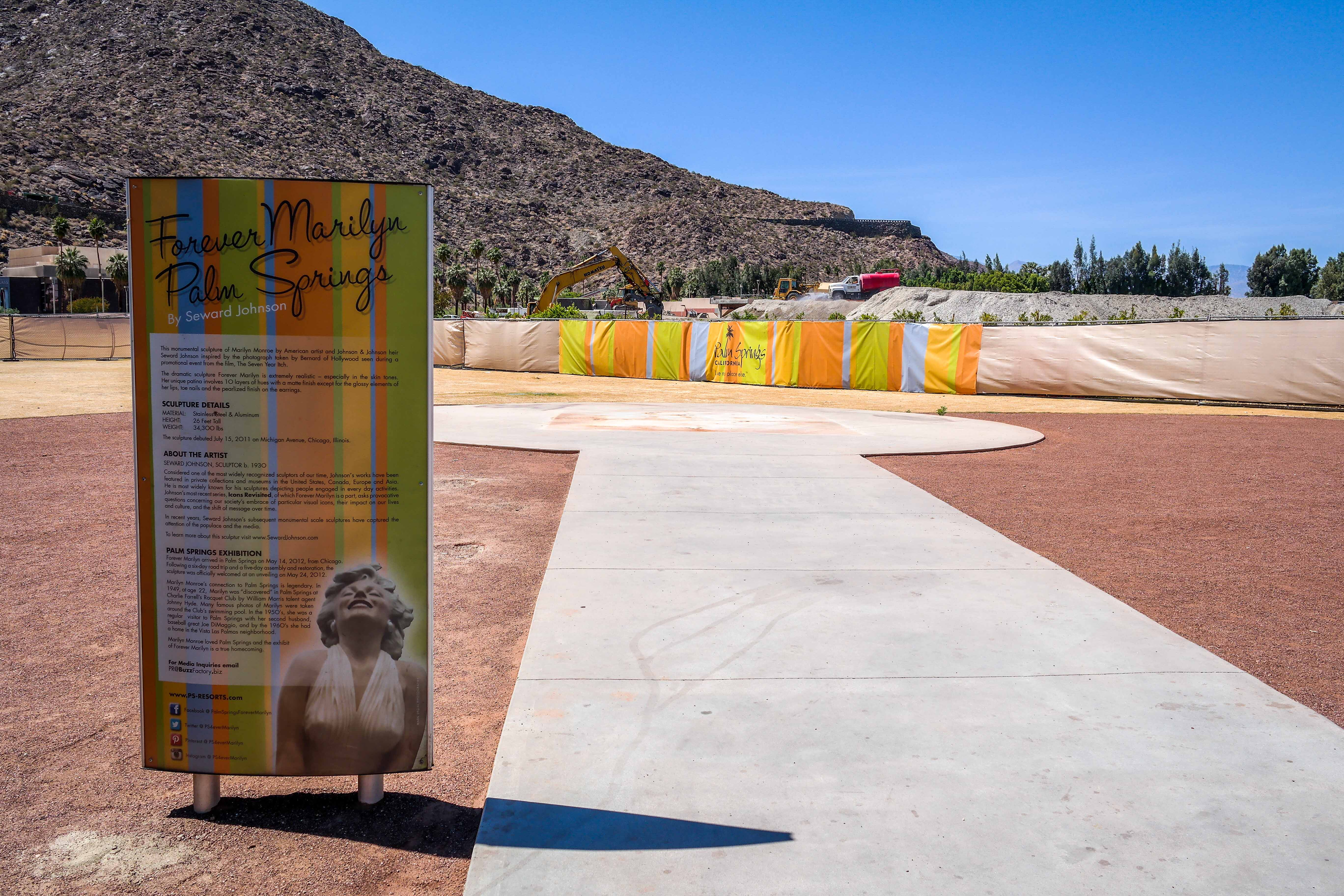
The former location of the Forever Marilyn statue in Palm Springs, California

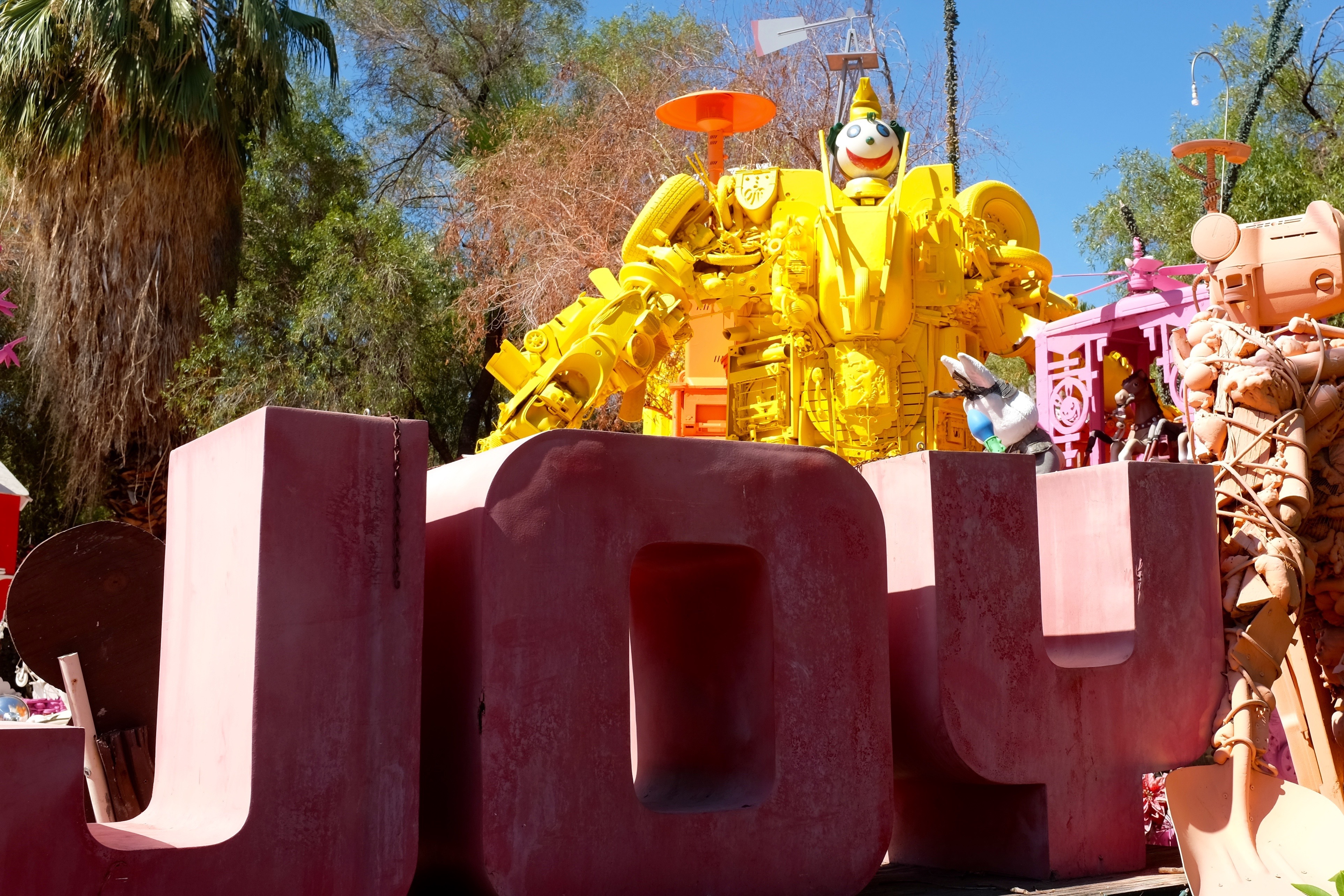
Robolights

The following works have been installed in Palm Springs:

- Agua Caliente Women
- Artificial Rock #131
- Babies (Černý)
- Banned Booty
- Bust of Sonny Bono
- Dance of the Forest Nymphs
- Forever Marilyn
- George Floyd mural
- Isabelle by Julian Voss-Andreae
- La Casa de Miguel
- Mural of George Floyd
- Palm Springs AIDS Memorial
- Pillars of Palm Springs
- Rainmaker Fountain (2000) by David Morris
- Reclining Figure 1956 by Henry Moore
- Red Dragon
- Robolights
- Square Waves
- Statue of Frank Bogert
- Statue of Lucille Ball
- Statue of Sonny Bono
- A Tale of Survival
- TOT
- Two Piece Reclining Figure No. 3
- The Warrior
- A Wing and a Prayer, Palm Springs International Airport
- Woman in Glasses by James Haunt & Zes MSK

== See also ==
- List of public art in Palm Desert, California
- Palm Springs Art Museum
