= Palm Springs AIDS Memorial =

- 33°49′28.22″N 116°32′54.71″W
- Location: Downtown Park, Palm Springs, California
- Designer: Phillip K. Smith III
- Dedicated to: HIV and AIDS memorial
- Website: psaidsmemorial.org

The Palm Springs AIDS Memorial is a proposed AIDS memorial sculpture, slated for installation in Palm Springs, California.

In the fall of 2021, the City of Palm Springs accepted a proposal to install an AIDS Memorial in the Downtown Park at Belardo Road and Museum Way, near the Forever Marilyn statue. Artist Phillip K. Smith III will create the memorial pro bono. As of June 2024, the memorial is being redesigned from the initial concept, which was an abstract design of a round limestone 9 ft (2.7 m) high with concentric circles and a hole in the center.

== See also ==
- List of public art in Palm Springs, California
