= Pougnet =

Pougnet is a French surname. Notable people with the surname include:

- Jean Pougnet (1907–1968), Mauritian-born British violinist and orchestra leader
- Steve Pougnet (born 1963), American businessman and politician
