= Sonny Bono Memorial Park =

Park in Washington, D.C., U.S.

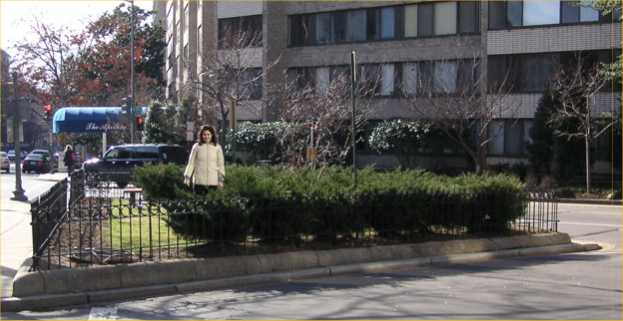
- Sonny Bono Memorial Park, January 2005

- Location within Washington, D.C. Location within the United States
- Location: Intersection of 20th Street, New Hampshire Avenue, O Street NW, Washington, D.C., US
- Coordinates: 38°54′30.5″N 77°2′41″W
- Area: 800 square feet (74 m^{2})
- Created: 1998

Sonny Bono Memorial Park is a public park in Washington, D.C., United States. Located at the intersection of 20th Street NW, New Hampshire Avenue NW, and O Street NW, near Dupont Circle, it is named for entertainer and politician Sonny Bono. The park was established later that year by Bono family friend, Geary Simon, a local real estate developer. He approached the District of Columbia Department of Parks and Recreation's Adopt-a-Park program and paid over $25,000 of his own money to revitalize an unused 800-square-foot (74 m^{2}) triangle of grass on a traffic island. His improvements to the park included plumbing, landscaping, and installing new furniture.

== History ==
=== Biography and memorial plans ===
Sonny Bono was an entertainer whose acting and singing with his wife, Cher, made him a celebrity during the 1960s and 1970s. Beginning in the late 1980s, Bono became involved with politics in California. His political career included serving as Mayor of Palm Springs, California from 1988 to 1992, and serving in the U.S. Congress from 1995 until his death from a skiing accident in 1998.

After his death, Geary Simon, a friend of Bono, and three-time convicted felon, was the second person to learn about the accident. Simon is a real estate developer in Washington, D.C., who became acquainted with Bono while serving in Congress. Speaking about Bono's death, Simon said "In life, you'll have a few male friends you absolutely trust, that you absolutely know you understand. Sonny was that kind of friend. For something that was in the scheme of life pretty short-term, it was just an incredible relationship."

Simon began planning a way to memorialize Bono in the nation's capital as a way to cope with the loss of his friend. He chose to utilize a small traffic island located near his house by creating a memorial park. In response, Bono's former press secretary said "I think he would have been very pleased and touched to be remembered with a place people can use and enjoy." Simon spoke with local government officials about using the traffic island. Citing the city's Adopt-a-Park program, which encourages residents to keep small parks clean, permission was granted by the program's director.

=== Memorial park ===
In early 1998, Simon began improving the site himself. The site had been a place where one could find trash, weeds, and rats, making it an unsightly area of the neighborhood. His first move was to clear the land with a rented backhoe followed by installing a black wrought-iron fence around the park. Additional improvements during the following months included adding Kentucky bluegrass, shrubbery, a tree from Bono's California congressional district, a sprinkler system, lights, and benches. The entrance to the park was also made wheelchair-accessible.

The transformation of the traffic island into a memorial site concerned some residents. Complaints included that Simon did not bring up the proposal to the Advisory Neighborhood Commission and that Bono had no social or political ties to the city. Regardless, Simon wanted a place where anyone could come and pay respects to Bono. The total cost of the park was $25,000, but upkeep costs Simon a few thousand dollars each year. Bono's widow, Mary Bono, appreciated the park and through a spokesperson said "Mary is grateful to Mr. Simon for the tribute to Sonny."

In 2013, a street rehabilitation of New Hampshire Avenue resulted in most of the park being destroyed by construction crews. Using the park as a staging area, the crews removed part of the fence, destroyed the benches, and left the landscaping in disarray. The repairs to the park cost approximately $20,000, and with help from the nearby Heurich House Museum (HHM), a fundraising campaign took place. The site was repaired, courtesy of local residents and HHM staff, after the HHM joined the Adopt-a-Park program.

== Location and design ==
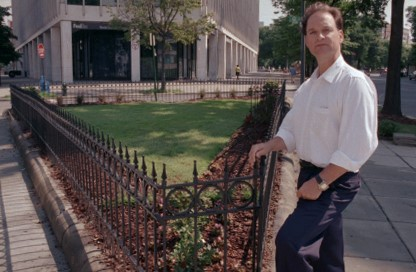
Geary Simon standing in front of the park in 1998

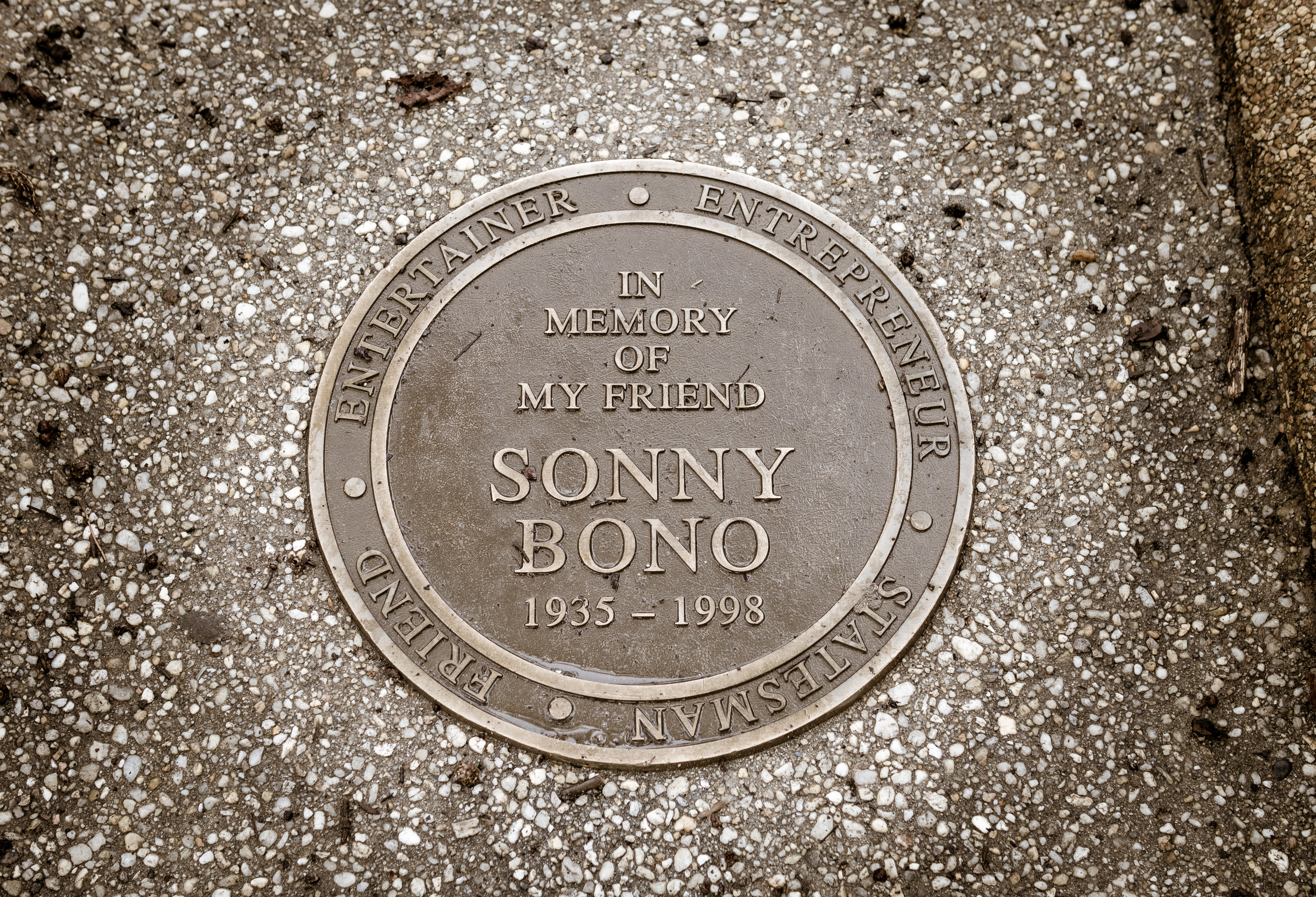
The plaque near the entrance to the park

The park is located on a small traffic island, Parcel 143, at the intersection of 20th Street NW, New Hampshire Avenue NW, and O Street NW, in the Dupont Circle neighborhood of Washington, D.C. The park is 800 square feet (74 m^{2}), and the total island measures 54.25 feet (16.54 m) long on the 20th Street side, 67.3 feet (20.5 m) long on the New Hampshire Avenue side, and 39.8 feet (12.1 m) on the O Street side.

At the entrance, on the ground, is a plaque that reads as follows:

IN MEMORY OF MY FRIEND SONNY BONO 1935-1998; ENTERTAINER - ENTREPRENEUR - STATESMAN - FRIEND.

Beneath the plaque is a vault of Bono memorabilia, including sheet music for "The Beat Goes On", his official Congressional cufflinks, and a mug from his string of Bono's Restaurants.
