= List of public art in Palm Desert, California =

This is a partial list of public art in Palm Desert, California in the United States. This list applies only to works of public art accessible in an outdoor public space. For example, this does not include artwork visible inside a museum or religious artwork associated with a church or place of worship.

Title	Image	Artist	Year	Location	Coordinates	Material	Dimensions	Owner
Agave		Gordon Huether		San Pascual and Fred Waring Dr.	33°43′44.8″N 116°22′42.9″W			City of Palm Desert
The Art Place				41801 Corporate Way	33°44′40.2″N 116°21′45.3″W			
Baja Palapa		Donna Billick & Arthur Gonzalez		Fred Waring Dr. and Primose	33°43′44.8″N 116°22′18.0″W			City of Palm Desert
Balance		William Disbro		Civic Center Park		Brushed and polished stainless steel	3 parts. Group with bike: approx. 96 x 96 x 48 in.; Boy on bike: approx. 79 x 96 x 48 in.; Racing bike: approx. 69 x 96 x 48 in.; Each base: approx. H. 3 1/2 in.	City of Palm Desert
Bighorn		Peter Madson, Curt Mattson, Shel McAdams		Bighorn Golf Club	33°40′44.0″N 116°24′32.6″W	Bronze	Approx. 6 ft. 4 in. x 6 ft. 2 in. x 6 ft. 3 in.	City of Palm Desert
Bus Shelter		Allen Root		Country Club Dr. & Desert Willow Dr.				City of Palm Desert
C is for Cat		Ann LaRose		Palm Desert Public Library		Bronze	Approx. H. 33 in.	City of Palm Desert
Cahuilla		Ron Gregory (designer)		Waring Plaza		Colored stamped concrete.	Approx. W. 35 ft. x D. 61 ft.	City of Palm Desert
Cantamar Series		Woods Davy		Oakmont of Sevogia	33°45′32.1″N 116°23′22.8″W			
Charger		Ted Gall		El Paseo median		Sculpture: painted and fabricated steel; Base: Cor-Ten steel	Sculpture: approx. 8 ft. 6 in. x 4 ft. 4 in. x 16 ft. 9 in.; Base: approx. W. 5 ft. x D. 10 ft.	City of Palm Desert
Chihuly at Desert Willow		Dale Chihuly		38995 Desert Willow Dr.				
City Entry Marker		Michael Watling						City of Palm Desert
Cliff Henderson		Henry McCann	1978	Median on El Paseo, east of Larkspur Lane		Bronze	Sculpture: approx. 28 x 24 x 16 in.; Base: approx. 45 x 31 x 23 in.	City of Palm Desert
Colleagues		William Disbro	1991	Civic Center Park	33°43′46.6″N 116°22′50.4″W	Brushed stainless steel	2 parts. Main group: approx. 95 x 120 x 48 in.; Base: approx. 4 x 120 x 48 in.; Female figure: approx. 95 x 60 x 48 in.; Base: approx. 4 x 60 x 48 in.	City of Palm Desert
Coyote Benches		Ben Watling		Civic Center Park		Mono-color concrete	5 benches. Each: approx. 19 x 12 x 60 in.	City of Palm Desert
Dancers		Bruce Thomas						
Dancing Starfish		Steve Jensen		McCallum Theatre		Carved cedar	H. 96 in.	City of Palm Desert
Dance to Discovery		Barbara Field		Palm Desert Public Library				City of Palm Desert
Danseur		Jean-Louis Corby		Civic Center Park				City of Palm Desert
Desert Aviary		Bill Ware		38801 Cook St.				
Desert Bloom		Greg Reiche		38995 Desert Willow Dr.				
Desert Bloom		Ellie Riley		73750 Dinah Shore Dr.	33°47′48.7″N 116°22′38.8″W			
Desert Dessert		Michael Anderson	1991	Civic Center Park		Painted steel	19 x 15 x 56 ft.	City of Palm Desert
Desert Flower/Star		Robert Perless	1992	Civic Center Park		2 sculptures. Each: approx. 11 x 20 x 8 ft.	Welded aluminum coated with Imron and polymer prisms	
Desert Holocaust Memorial		Dee Clements	1995	Civic Center Park	33°43′51.3″N 116°22′44.1″W	Sculpture: bronze; Base: marble and black granite.	Overall: approx. 10 x 60 x 91 ft.; Tallest figure: approx. H. 7 ft. 9 in.; Star of David: approx. 1 x 21 x 21 ft.	City of Palm Desert
Desert Willow Fence		Allen Root		Desert Willow Resort				
Desert Willow Monument Sign		Allen Root		NW corner of Country Club Dr. and Desert Willow Dr.				
Diegueno		Christina Beresford	1968	Waring Plaza	33°43′48.7″N 116°24′8.9″W	Colored concrete	Diam. 20 ft.	City of Palm Desert
The Dreamer		David Phelps	1989	Civic Center Plaza		Bronze	Approx. 48 x 81 x 160 in.	City of Palm Desert
Egrets		Bill Ware		41726 Via Aregio	33°44′43.2″N 116°22′22.5″W			
Feng Shui II		Jon Seeman			33°43′42.9″N 116°23′18.8″W			
Flute Players		Bill Ware		44250 Town Center Way				
Fred's Skies		Jeni Bate		Fred Waring Dr. and Town Center Way				
Gaudi Style Benches		Marlo Bartels		Spanish Walk division, 75600 Gerald Ford Dr.	33°46′22.7″N 116°20′39.6″W			
Giraffe		William Allen		Palm Desert Public Library				
Gravity Wave		Michael Watling		Highway 111 and Park View				
Ground Swell		Phillip K. Smith, III		36891 Cook St.	33°46′52.4″N 116°21′21.8″W			
Happy Swinging		Monyo Mihailescu-Nasturel		YMCA, Civic Center Park	33°43′56.2″N 116°22′51.8″W	Bronze	Sculpture: approx. 112 x 34 x 55 in.	City of Palm Desert
In Praise of Cahuilla Baskets		Michael Watling	1992	Nothing Bundt Cakes	33°43′53.4″N 116°24′15.0″W	Cor-Ten steel, stamped color concrete	Sculpture: approx. 11 ft. 3 in. x 16 ft. x 17 ft.; Base: approx. Diam. 44 ft.	City of Palm Desert
Lake Cahuilla Palms		Larry & Nancy Cush		Coachella Valley Water District	33°44′38.0″N 116°21′0.6″W	Mosaic, palm trees		City of Palm Desert
Levi Man		John Richen		Tucson Circle and Washington St.	33°44′2.7″N 116°18′14.8″W			
The Markers		Otto Rigan	1992	Indian Ridge Country Club	33°45′28.7″N 116°19′56.3″W	Utah sandstone and laminated mirrored glass	6 markers. Range from: approx. H. 4 ft. to 11 ft. x W. 3 ft. to 5 ft. x D. 1 ft. to 2 ft. (18 tons).	City of Palm Desert
Memorial Community Walk		Howard and Kathleen, Meehan		Civic Center Park	33°43′52.8″N 116°22′51.8″W	Ceramic, concrete and stone		City of Palm Desert
Men and Women of Steel		Steven L. Rieman	1995	Palm Desert Corporation Yard		Stop sign and sweeper broom flat wire	H. 64 in. x W. 64 in.	City of Palm Desert
Messenger of the Puul		Curt Mattson	1991	Civic Center Park	33°43′48.7″N 116°22′47.4″W	Bronze	Sculpture: approx. 9 ft. 6 in. x 4 ft. 6 in. x 4 ft. 8 in.; Base: approx. 14 in. x 10 ft. x 10 ft. x Diam. 10 ft.; Base planter: approx. Diam. 20 ft.	City of Palm Desert
Midnight Oasis		Larson Company	1995	Desert Crossing Shopping Center	33°43′48.7″N 116°22′47.4″W	Bronze	Sculpture: approx. 9 ft. 6 in. x 4 ft. 6 in. x 4 ft. 8 in.; Base: approx. 14 in. x 10 ft. x 10 ft. x Diam. 10 ft.; Base planter: approx. Diam. 20 ft.	City of Palm Desert
Midstream		J. Seward Johnson, Jr.		Civic Center Park		Painted and gilded bronze	Approx. 70 x 30 x 32 in.	City of Palm Desert
Morning Light, Evening Light, and Dreaming Cahuilla Basketry		Marlo Bartels		35900 Monterey Ave.	33°47′14.9″N 116°23′16.1″W			
Morningstar Overture		Russell Jacques		Palm Desert Recovery Center	33°43′43.4″N 116°22′44.1″W			
Mother/Child Sculpture Garden		Lisa Reinertson		Civic Center Park				
Mountain Lions		Ken Bjorge	1993	Living Desert Zoo and Gardens	33°43′42.1″N 116°24′11.0″W	Concrete over a steel armature	3 camels. Camel 1: approx. H. 8 ft. 8 in. x W. 3 ft. 6 in. (2,000 lbs.); Camel 2: approx. H. 9 ft. 4 in. x W. 3 ft. 4 in. (1,800 lbs.); Camel 3: approx. H. 8 ft. x W. 2 ft. (1,200 lbs.).	City of Palm Desert
Music		Leonard Nierman		McCallum Theatre	33°43′46.7″N 116°23′20.8″W	Polished aluminum	Approx. 12 x 6 x 2 ft.	City of Palm Desert
Neoglyphs		Michael Watling	1993	Palm Desert Civic Center		Arizona sandstone	35 pieces	City of Palm Desert
New Beginnings		Bill Ware		10500 Via Foruna				
Ocotillo Garden		Brian Gottlieb		Merit Property Management Inc.	33°44′7.8″N 116°21′21.8″W			
Palm Desert Obelisk		Marlo Bartels	ca. 1995	Avenue of the States at Washington, center median	33°44′26.4″N 116°18′14.9″W	Ceramic tile over concrete	21 x 3 x 3 ft.	City of Palm Desert
For Our Freedom		Romo Studios		Freedom Park				City of Palm Desert
Passing it Along		Dee Clements	1993	Joslyn Center, 73750 Catalina Way	33°43′36.1″N 116°22′43.0″W	Bronze	Sculpture: approx. 5 x 4 x 3 ft.; Base: approx. 19 in. x 4 ft. x 3 ft.	City of Palm Desert
Peace Fountain		Bill Ware		Hampton Inn	33°46′55.3″N 116°21′26.0″W			
Peace Memorial		Marton Varo	1992	Civic Center Park	33°43′49.9″N 116°22′53.7″W	White Carrara marble, black granite, marble	Sculpture: approx. 75 x 55 x 66 in.; Pillars: approx. 10 ft. x 20 in. x 20 in.; Base: approx. L. 10 ft.	City of Palm Desert
Perpetual Motion		Bruce Stillman		Palm Desert Public Library				City of Palm Desert
Portals		Harold L. Pastorius	1977	College of the Desert, Corner of Parkview and Monterey	33°43′57.7″N 116°23′25.5″W	Cor-Ten steel	10 x 17 x 2 ft.	City of Palm Desert
Porte Cochere Entry		Bill Ware		38305 Cook St.				
Proceed with Caution		Gary Alsum		Palm Desert Aquatic Center, Civic Center Park				City of Palm Desert
Pulled Up Prince		Gary Price		Fred Waring Dr. and Town Center Way				
Recreation Liberties		Jos Golmolka		Community Center, Civic Center Park				
The Reed Gatherer		Tom Knapp		Civic Center Park		Sculpture: bronze; Basin: sand aggregate	Sculpture: approx. 5 ft. 7 in. x 5 ft. 4 in. x 33 in.; Base: approx. 8 in. x 3 ft. x 4 ft. 8 in.	City of Palm Desert
Reminiscing		John Kennedy		Palm Desert Public Library				City of Palm Desert
Rising to Dawn		Peter Ladochy		72875 Fred Waring Dr. at San Luis Dr.	33°43′42.5″N 116°23′36.0″W	Stone, tile, glass and wood mounted to cement fiber board	Approx. 5 x 8 x 1 ft.	City of Palm Desert
The Roadrunner		Allen Root		78000 Fred Waring Drive	33°43′45.1″N 116°18′14.9″W			City of Palm Desert
Saturday Morning		Art Myers	1990	College Golf Center, College of the Desert, 73450 Fred Waring Dr.		Bronze	2 figures. Male: approx. 6 ft. x 48 in. x 21 in.; Female: approx. 67 x 23 x 14 in.	City of Palm Desert
Scroll Fence		Ries Niemi		Palm Desert Public Library				
The Seed		Steven Zaluski, Elizabeth Mapelli	1991	Annenberg Center for Health Sciences	33°47′44.6″N 116°22′36.1″W	Fabricated bronze, glass tiles, ceramic tile	Sculpture: approx. 7 ft. 6 in. x 7 ft. 3 in. x 4 ft. 9 in.; Base: approx. H. 5 ft. x Diam. 27 in.; Basin: approx. 4 ft. 5 in. x 30 ft. x 25 ft.	City of Palm Desert
Self-Preservation Revised		Edward Pogue		Civic Center Park		Bronze	142 x 16 x 16 in.	City of Palm Desert
Stone Eagle		Michael Watling		48009 Highway 74				
Sunflower and Snowbirds		Sharles		Civic Center Park	33°44′26.4″N 116°18′14.9″W	Bronze with patina	2 reliefs. Each relief: approx. Diam. 32 in.	City of Palm Desert
Sunburst		Bill Ware		Sunlife Medical Group	33°43′42.9″N 116°23′13.4″W			
Sunrise Sunset		Norman P. Hines	1991	Corner of Highway 74 and Haystack	33°42′10.8″N 116°23′49.1″W	Desert red granite	Approx. 8 x 16 x 10 ft.	City of Palm Desert
Swim, Dive, Play		Paul Hobson (artist)		Palm Desert Aquatic Center, Civic Center Park				City of Palm Desert
Synergy		Jon Seeman		ampm	33°46′54.6″N 116°21′21.6″W			
Today		Brian Gottlieb, Rob Pitchford		Civic Center Park		Sculpture: stainless steel and painted iron; Base: concrete and Corian.	Sculpture: approx. 102 x 126 x 84 in.; Base: approx. Diam. 18 ft.	City of Palm Desert
Tumbling Weed		Heath Satow		34500 Monterey Ave.	33°47′48.8″N 116°23′4.4″W			
Tucson Ruin		Roger Hopkins		74401 Hovley Ln. E.				
Untitled		Marlo Bartels, Palm Deily, Eric Johnson	1989	OneWest Bank	33°43′26.7″N 116°23′55.6″W	Ceramic tile	Approx. H. 9 ft. 2 in. x W. 8 ft. 2 in.	City of Palm Desert
Untitled		Brian Painter	1991	Albert Management Inc., Cook Street & Hovely Lane	33°44′48.5″N 116°21′21.3″W	Weathering steel	18 x 12 x 13 1/2 ft. (10,000 lbs.)	City of Palm Desert
Walking Man		Jon Krawczyk			33°43′43.″N 116°23′30.″W			City of Palm Desert
The Willow		Steve Reman		The Westin Desert Willow Villas				
Wisdom Given		Alexander Bashta III			33°43′43.3″N 116°22′50.5″W		Palm Desert Dental Center	City of Palm Desert

== See also ==
- List of public art in Palm Springs, California
