= Statue of Lucille Ball =

Statue of Lucille Ball may refer to:

- Statue of Lucille Ball (Celoron, New York)
- Statue of Lucille Ball (Palm Springs, California)
