= Ron Oden =

American politician (born 1950)

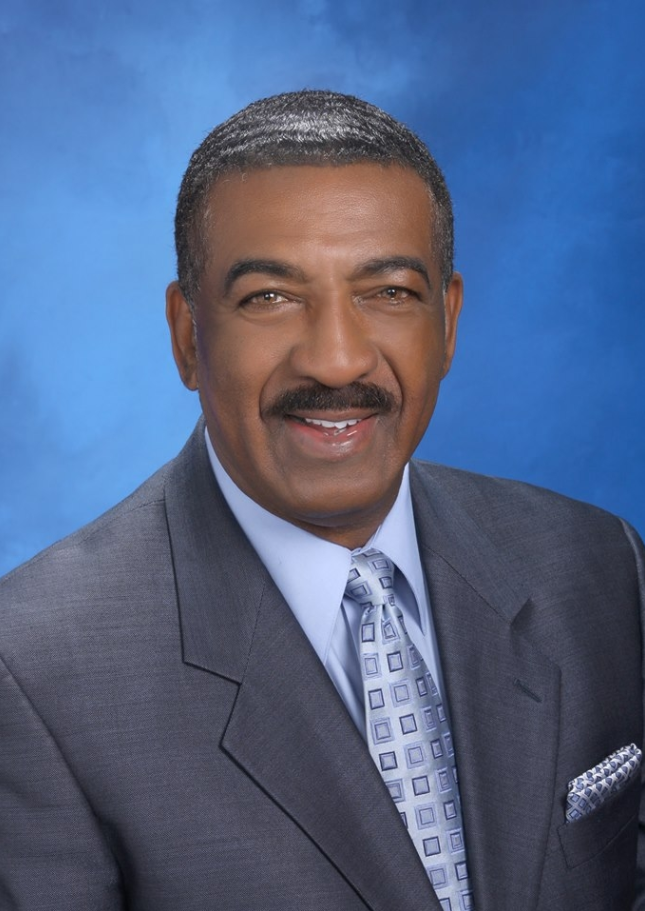

19th Mayor of Palm Springs
- In office December 3, 2003 – December 5, 2007
- Preceded by: Will Kleindienst
- Succeeded by: Steve Pougnet

Mayor Pro Tem of Palm Springs
- In office December 18, 2002 – December 3, 2003
- Preceded by: Jeanne Reller-Spurgin
- Succeeded by: Chris Mills

College of the Desert Board of Trustee Chair
- Incumbent
- Assumed office December 19, 2025
- Preceded by: Joel Kinnamon

College of the Desert Board of Trustee Vice Chair
- In office December 20th, 2024 – December 19, 2025
- Preceded by: Bea Gonzalez
- Succeeded by: Ruben Perez

Member of the College of the Desert Board of Trustee District 3
- Incumbent
- Assumed office May 19, 2022
- Preceded by: Fred E. Jandt

Personal details
- Born: March 21, 1950 (age 76) Detroit, Michigan, U.S.
- Party: Democratic
- Children: 2

Ron Oden (born March 21, 1950) is an American politician. In November 2003, he was elected the first gay African-American mayor of Palm Springs, California, after serving eight years on the city council. He became the first Black openly gay man elected mayor of a U.S. city. He was also "the first gay African-American elected to lead a California city." (Note: "The awards are presented annually to individuals who bring awareness to and further the causes of lesbian, gay, bisexual and transgender communities. This year's six recipients include a former mayor, a teacher, a retired Army Master Sergeant, and a veteran drag performer.") In December 2017, Palm Springs elected "America's first all-LGBTQ city council."

== Biography ==
=== Early life and education ===
Oden was born on March 21, 1950, in Detroit, Michigan, and grew up in Los Angeles, California. He attended Oakwood University in Huntsville, Alabama, earning a Bachelor of Arts in history, sociology, and theology. He also went on to earn a Master of Arts degree in theology at Andrews University in Berrien Springs, Michigan, as well as a Master of Arts degree in ethnic studies at the University at Albany, SUNY. He is an ordained Seventh-day Adventist minister, who resigned shortly before entering politics.

=== Politics ===
In 1990, Oden moved to Palm Springs, California, to begin teaching at the College of the Desert as an adjunct sociology instructor. Concern about educational and social issues motivated Oden to enter politics, and in 1995, he was elected to the Palm Springs City Council.

In 2000, Oden ran for Congress on a limited budget, capturing 38% of the vote.

In 2003, Oden was elected Mayor of Palm Springs. As the first openly gay African American mayor elected in California, Oden's election made global news headlines. Oden's tenure as mayor was notable for his work promoting organizations focused on diversity, including the Palm Springs Human Rights Task Force, the Palm Springs Human Rights Commission, and the Palm Springs branch of the NAACP. Oden also brought in the Palm Springs City Council's first gay majority.

Palm Springs saw historic growth during Oden's tenure, with the city's budget doubling during his term. Oden saw success in building Palm Springs as a destination resort city, helped by a new concourse being added to the Palm Springs International Airport in 2007 and new amenities like the Palm Springs Skatepark, considered one of California's best skateparks.

In June 2006, he ran for and lost in the Democratic primary for a seat in the California State Assembly by less than 100 votes.

In 2007, he was honored with a Golden Palm Star on the Palm Springs Walk of Stars.

In 2015, eight years after the completion of his initial stint as mayor, Oden once again ran for mayor of Palm Springs. He campaigned on a platform calling for governmental transparency and restoration of trust and faith in city leadership. He wanted elected officials to disclose their income and its sources, a response to allegations of "conflict of interest between the current mayor Steve Pougnet and a private developer." Oden wanted to restore the proper course of conduct to investors and entrepreneurs: "Businessmen are investors in our city. They’re not bad people but I think people get stirred and go the wrong way.” Oden also wanted to assuage the “eroding relationship” with the Agua Caliente Band of Cahuilla Indians and address the status of a west campus for College of the Desert. He used to teach there, and it disappeared without much discussion. Finally, Oden acknoweledged that he had been out of politics for several years, and said he "hopes to channel Frank Bogert," the city's first directly elected mayor, who successfully "came back for seconds" almost three decades later.

Oden lost the election to Robert Moon.

In 2023 Oden was unanimously appointed to the Desert Community College District Board of Trustees to finish Fred Jandt's term before winning his own term for District 3 in 2024.

=== Personal life and legacy ===
Oden is openly gay and is the father of two daughters, Brooke and Brittany Oden. He is also the grandfather of two granddaughters and two grandsons.

In recognition of his role in the Palm Springs community as the first openly gay African American elected as mayor of a California city, and 30 year of public service, Oden was awarded the Lifetime Achievement Award by Great Palm Springs Pride at the 2019 Pride Honors Awards.

== See also ==
- List of first African-American mayors
- African American mayors in California

Political offices
Preceded by Will Kleindienst	Mayor of Palm Springs, California; December 1, 2003–December 5, 2007	Succeeded by Steve Pougnet
Preceded by Jeanne Reller-Spurgin	Mayor Pro Tem of Palm Springs, California; December 18, 2002–December 3, 2003	Succeeded by Chris Mills
Academic offices
Preceded by Fred E. Jandt	COD Board Member, 3rd District; May 19, 2022	Incumbent
Preceded by Joel Kinnamon	COD Board, Chair; December 19, 2025	Incumbent
Preceded by Bea Gonzalez	COD Board, Vice Chair; December 20th, 2024 – December 19, 2025	Succeeded by Ruben Perez
