= Lisa Middleton =

American transgender politician (born 1962)

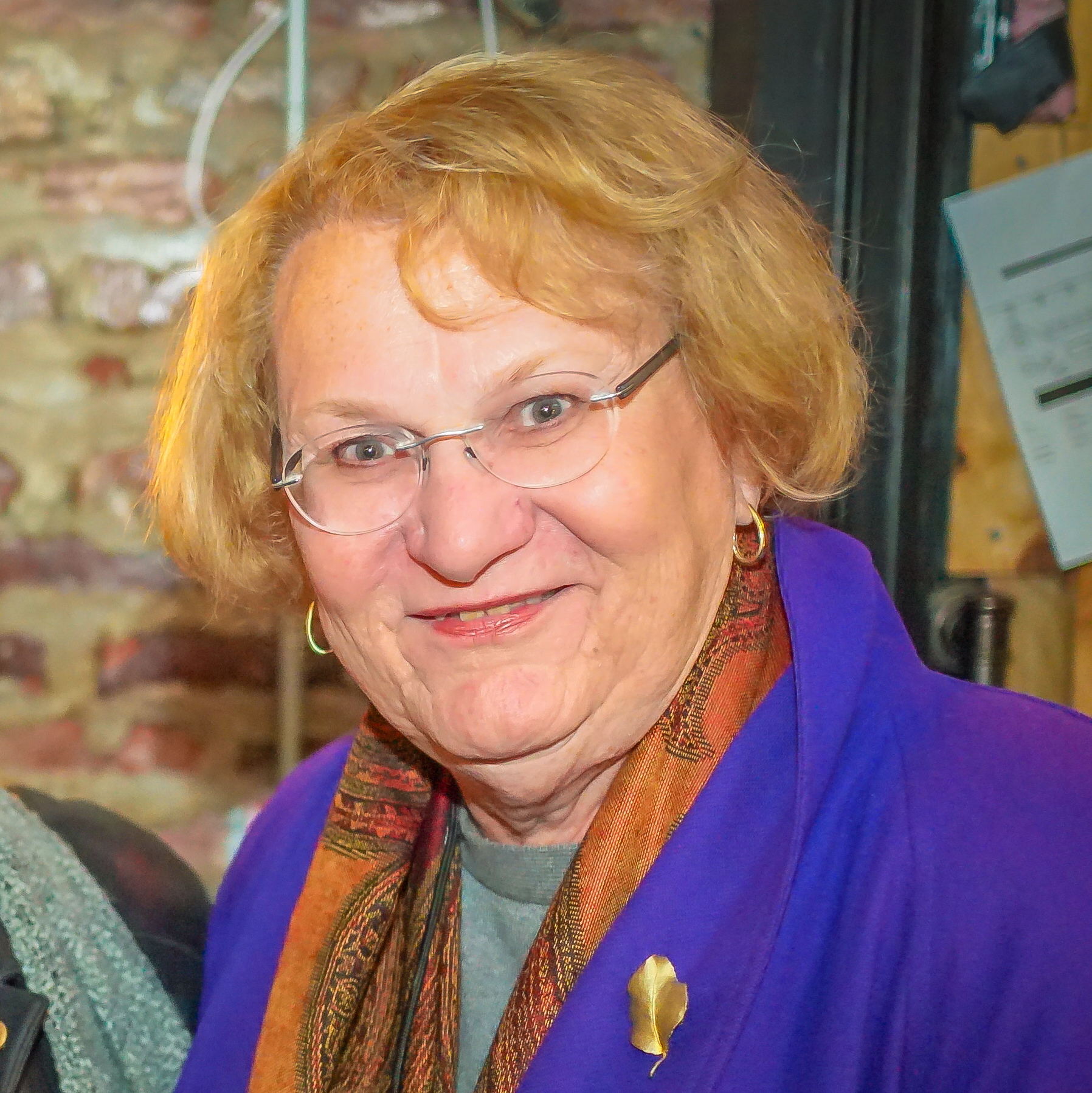
- Lisa Middleton in 2017

Mayor of Palm Springs
- In office December 9, 2021 – December 16, 2022
- Preceded by: Christy Holstege
- Succeeded by: Grace Elena Garner

Mayor Pro Tempore of Palm Springs
- In office December 10, 2020 – December 9, 2021
- Preceded by: Christy Holstege
- Succeeded by: Grace Elena Garner

Member of the Palm Springs City Council
- In office December 6, 2017 – December 12, 2024
- Preceded by: Ginny Foat
- Succeeded by: David Ready
- Constituency: At Large District (2017-2020); 5th District (2020-2024)

Personal details
- Spouse: Cheryl (m. 2013)
- Children: 2
- Education: University of California, Los Angeles
- Alma mater: University of Southern California (MPA)
- Known for: First openly transgender person elected to a non-judicial office in California

Lisa Middleton (born 1952) is an American politician who served as the Mayor of Palm Springs from 2021 to 2022. A member of the Democratic Party, Middleton served on the Palm Springs City Council from 2017 to 2024, and is the first openly transgender person elected in California for a non-judicial position.

After serving as Mayor Pro Tempore of Palm Springs from 2020 to 2021, Middleton succeeded Christy Holstege as the city's mayor on December 9, 2021, and became the first openly transgender mayor in California.

== Early life and education ==
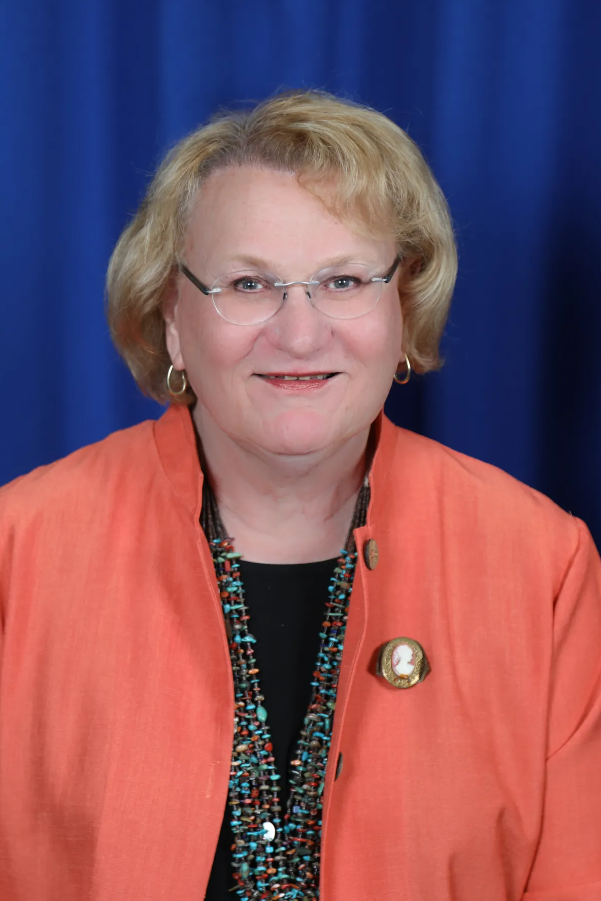
Lisa Middleton as Palm Springs Mayor.

Middleton was born and raised in East Los Angeles. She attended UCLA, graduating in 1974 with a bachelor's degree in political science. In 1979, Middleton earned a Master of Public Administration from University of Southern California. She has also completed the UCLA LGBT Leadership Institute.

== Career ==
Middleton worked for 36 years with the State Compensation Insurance Fund of the State of California. When she retired she was the senior vice president of internal affairs with executive responsibility for internal audit, fraud investigation, public records and governance. She was also a member of California's Fraud Assessment Commission, which she chaired in 2010.

Middleton also served on the Riverside County Transportation Commission, the Sunline Board of Directors as Chair, and as an alternate to the Metrolink Board of Directors. She was appointed in April 2019 by Governor Gavin Newsom to the California Public Employees Retirement System (CalPERS) Board of Administration. She was a member of the League of California Cities (Cal Cities) Board of Directors and the President (September 2021 – 2022) of the Cal Cities Riverside County Division.

In 2024, Middleton ran an unsuccessful bid for a seat in the California State Senate. She was term-limited from continuing to serve on the Palm Springs City Council, and thus had to resign from CalPERS in February 2025. In September 2025, Newsom reappointed Middleton to CalPERS as a representative of the insurance industry.

== Personal life ==
After 13 years together, Lisa and her wife Cheryl, a retired nurse, were married in July 2013. They have two children, a son and a daughter. Middleton is transgender and transitioned in the mid-1990s.

== See also ==
- List of transgender public officeholders in the United States
