= Downtown Park (Palm Springs, California) =

Public park

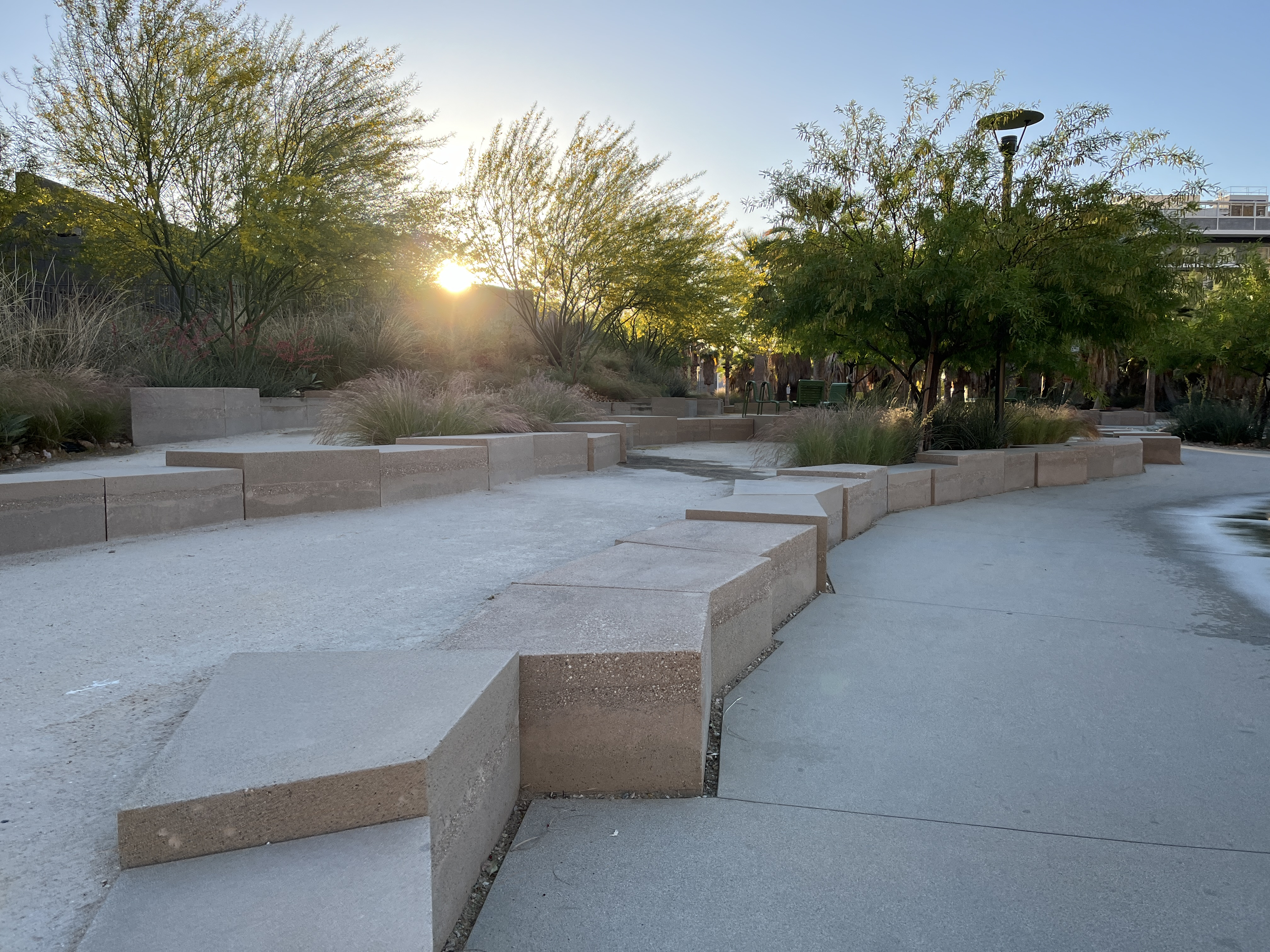
- The park in 2024
- Interactive map of Downtown Park
- Location: Palm Springs, California, U.S.
- Coordinates: 33.8244°N 116.5486°W

Downtown Park is a public park in Palm Springs, California.
