= Forever Marilyn =

Sculpture of Marilyn Monroe by John Seward Johnson II

- Forever Marilyn in front of the Palm Springs Art Museum in 2021
- Artist: Seward Johnson
- Year: 2011
- Type: Painted steel and aluminum
- Dimensions: 790 cm (26 ft)
- Location: Chicago, IL (2011–12); Hamilton Township, NJ (2014–15); Bendigo, Australia (2016); Stamford, CT (2018); Palm Springs, CA (2012–14, 2021–)
- Owner: PS Resorts

Forever Marilyn is a giant statue of Marilyn Monroe designed by Seward Johnson. The statue is a representation of the image of Monroe taken from Billy Wilder's 1955 film The Seven Year Itch. Created in 2011, the statue has been displayed in a variety of locations in the United States, as well as in Australia.

== Description ==
The 26-foot-tall (7.9 m) 34,000-pound (15,000 kg) sculpture, manufactured of painted stainless steel and aluminium, is a super-sized tribute to Marilyn Monroe's scene from Billy Wilder's 1955 infidelity comedy, The Seven-Year Itch, with the figure capturing the instant a blast of air from a NYC subway grate raises her white dress.

== Locations ==
The statue was displayed at Pioneer Court part of the Magnificent Mile section of Chicago, Illinois. In August and September 2011 the statue was vandalized three times, including being splashed with red paint. According to the executive director of the Chicago Public Arts Group, "In our society, we have little room for sexually expressive images ... The social contract doesn't work, because it is itself laden with political meaning, and provocative meaning and sexual meaning."

It was moved in 2012 to the corner of Palm Canyon Drive and Tahquitz Canyon Way in Palm Springs, California. It was given a farewell sendoff during the Palm Springs Village Fest on March 27, 2014, and was then relocated to the Grounds for Sculpture (GFS) in Hamilton, New Jersey as part of a 2014 retrospective honoring Seward Johnson. Due to its popularity, the statue remained on display at the GFS until September 2015, after the official end of the retrospective.

The statue was displayed in 2016 in Rosalind Park in the Australian city of Bendigo in connection with the Bendigo Art Gallery's Marilyn Monroe exhibition.

In 2018 the statue was displayed at Latham Park in Stamford, Connecticut, as part of a large public art exhibition honoring the works of Seward Johnson. Thirty-six sculptures were placed throughout streets and parks in Downtown Stamford, with Forever Marilyn being the highlight of the exhibit. The statue sparked controversy when it was placed in Stamford with complaints arising due to her appearing to flash her underwear at the nearby First Congregational Church.

In September 2019, Palm Springs mayor Robert Moon announced the statue's return to Palm Springs as a permanent fixture after being stored in a dismantled state in New Jersey. On February 3, 2021 it was announced that the statue would be erected on Museum Way just east of the Palm Springs Art Museum with an unveiling date of April 18, 2021. According to the announcement, Forever Marilyn was set to remain in Palm Springs for up to three years: in two years' time the statue's local economic impact was scheduled to be reviewed and its future decided. Litigation seeking to block the erection of Forever Marilyn was filed in the California courts. The statue was unveiled on June 20, 2021, with the Riverside County Superior Court dismissing four of the Committee to Relocate Marilyn's purported causes of action on July 18, 2021, with the committee's remaining two purported causes being dismissed by the Riverside County Superior Court on September 9, 2021.

The city council voted in 2023 to amend the Palm Springs Specific Plan to keep the statue in its current location by vacating a small portion of public right of way to create a parcel for the statue. The mayor announced in July 2024 that the statue would be moved out of the Museum Way view corridor to Downtown Park under an agreement that would avoid future litigation.

== Replica ==
A similar but taller stainless steel statue, 26.8-foot-tall (8.18 m) tall, was made in China. It had been put on display at a Chinese business center in 2013 to highlight the business's international relations. In June 2014 the eight-ton statue was photographed in a local Guigang, China garbage dump. This statue is featured twice in the 2017 Chinese drama film, Angels Wear White. It is shown both at the start of the film on full display, and as part of the poignant commentary at the end of the film, in the process of being discarded in pieces and hauled away.

== See also ==
- Marilyn Monroe in popular culture
- Statue of Shakira, colossal statue of an entertainer in Colombia
