= Agua Caliente Women =

Sculpture by Doug Hyde in Palm Springs, California, U.S.

- The sculpture in 2024
- Artist: Doug Hyde
- Year: 1994
- Location: Palm Springs, California, U.S.
- 33.8231°N 116.5454°W

Agua Caliente Women is a sculpture by American artist Doug Hyde, installed in Palm Springs, California.The statue was commissioned in 1994 as part of the city's "Art in Public Places" program and cost $141,000.

== Description ==
Agua Caliente Women is installed on a median at the intersection of Tahquitz Canyon Drive and Indian Canyon Drive in Palm Springs. It is located at an entry point for Section 14, which is a one-mile square area of the city that had been divided between the Agua Caliente Band of Cahuilla Indians tribe and workers of the Southern Pacific Railroad.

The statue consists of four elements, the principal of which are a pair of Agua Caliente women carrying baskets for harvest. It is constructed out of bronze, clay, and stone boulder. It is one of a number of sculptures located around the city, including another work by Hyde - A Young Basketmaker - which is also found on Tahquitz Canyon Way.

== History ==
The Agua Caliente Women was commissioned as part of the Palm Springs "Art in Public Places" program which had been launched in 1988. The city council decided to create a statue dedicated to the Agua Caliente people. A contest was held in 1992, which was won by Doug Hyde, an American sculptor from Oregon with from Assiniboine, Nez Perce, and Chippewa ancestry. The cost of the sculpture was $141,000.

The statue was completed in November 1994 and was installed using cranes on the 28th of that month. The chair of Palm Springs's arts commission, Patricia Peterson, said "we feel that it's going to be the most magnificent piece in the whole Coachella Valley" ahead of a decision by the commission to accept the sculpture. It was officially unveiled on 9 December at a ceremony attended by more than 200 people. Replicas of the sculpture were then created as part of an exhibition which took place at Coffman's Fine Art Gallery in February 1995 alongside works by Tom G Phillips.

== See also ==
- Agua Caliente Band of Cahuilla Indians
