= Steve Pougnet =

American businessman and politician

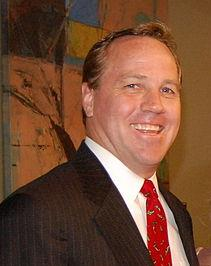

20th Mayor of Palm Springs
- In office December 5, 2007 – December 9, 2015
- Preceded by: Ron Oden
- Succeeded by: Robert Moon

Mayor Pro Tem of Palm Springs
- In office December 6, 2006 – December 5, 2007
- Preceded by: Ginny Foat
- Succeeded by: Ginny Foat

Member of the Palm Springs City Council for the At Large district
- In office December 3, 2003 – December 5, 2007

Personal details
- Born: Stephen P. Pougnet; April 27, 1963 (age 63) Flint, Michigan, U.S.
- Party: Democratic
- Spouse: Christopher Green (m. 2008)
- Children: 2

Stephen P. "Steve" Pougnet (born April 27, 1963) is an American businessman and politician. A member of the Democratic Party, Pougnet served as the mayor of Palm Springs, California from 2007 to 2015.

== Background ==
Pougnet was born in Flint, Michigan. Pougnet earned his Bachelor of Arts in business from Michigan State University in 1985 and was elected to the Palm Springs City Council in 2003. In 2017, he was accused of receiving $375,000 in bribes from John Wessman and Richard Meany, land and property developers of the Palm Springs area. Pougnet is currently awaiting arraignment on corruption charges. He is free on $25,000 bail. On May 14, 2025 in Banning, California Pougnet, 62, plead guilty to eight counts each of accepting bribes and illicit financial interest in public contracts and one count of conspiracy. He pleaded no contest to the three counts of perjury, the District Attorney's office confirmed. He was sentenced on July 2, 2025 to two years probation and ordered to pay $325,000 in restitution to the City of Palm Springs.

== Positions held ==
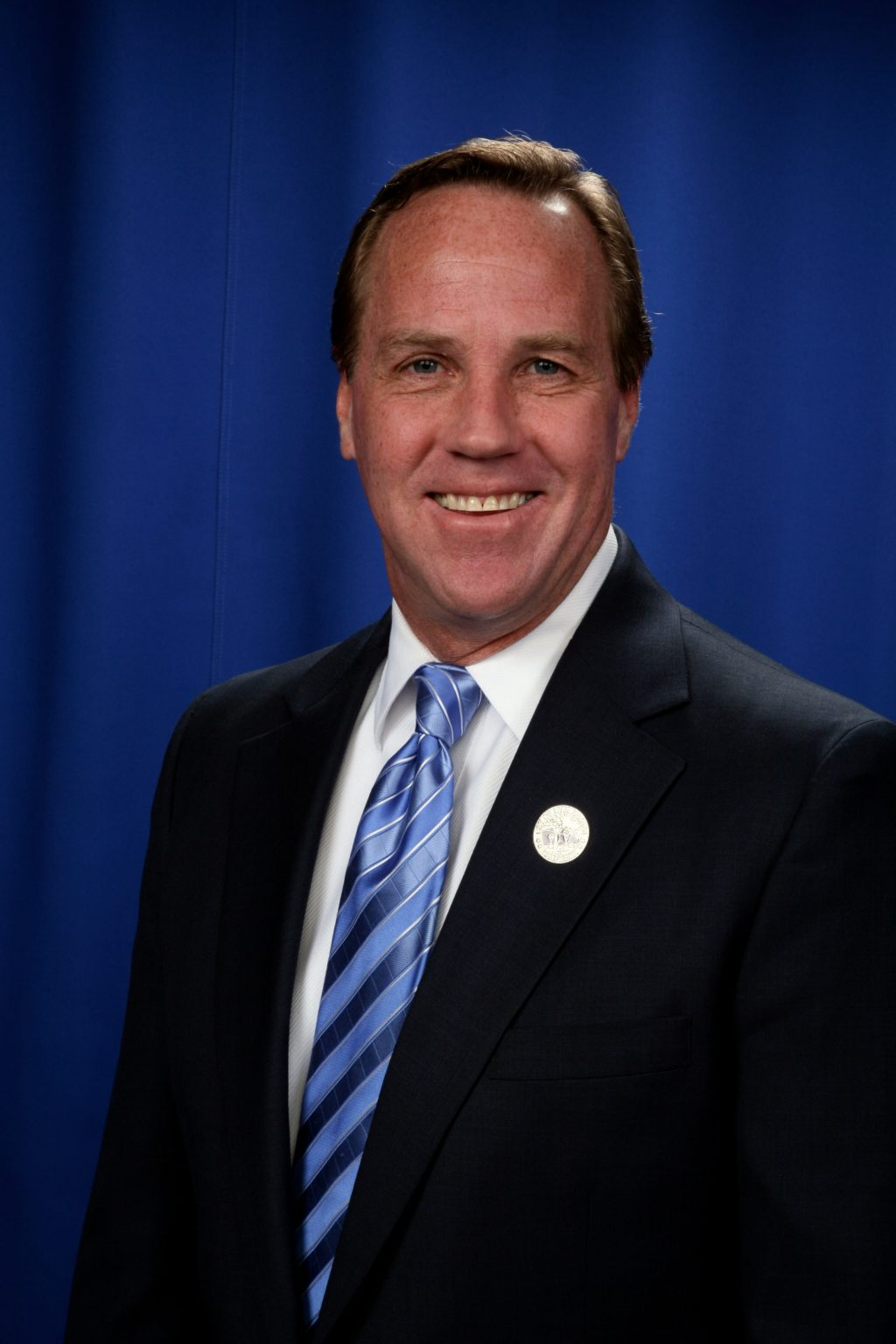
Steve Pougnert as Palm Springs Mayor.

- Vice Chairman of the Coachella Valley Association of Governments (CVAG)
- Chairman of the Energy & Water Conservation Subcommittee
- Vice Chairman of the CVAG Energy and Environment Committee
- Vice Chairman of Sunline Transit Agency, the region’s public transportation management organization
- Board Member of the Palm Springs Desert Resort Convention Visitors Authority
- Member of the Riverside County Transportation Commission.
- Riverside County Indian Gaming Local Community Benefit Committee.
- Mayor of Palm Springs until bribery charges were brought against him. He currently faces 21 felony counts, including perjury, public corruption and conspiracy.

== Family ==
Pougnet is openly gay. He married Christopher Green in 2008, and they have two twin children named Beckham and Julia.

== Elections ==
In 2010, Pougnet ran unopposed in the June 2010 primary election to win the Democratic nomination for the United States House of Representatives seat representing California's 45th congressional district. In the November 2010 election, he ran against American Independent Bill Lussenheide and Republican incumbent, Mary Bono Mack. Bono Mack defeated both Pougnet and Lussenheide in the general election.

== See also ==
- List of mayors of Palm Springs, California

Political offices
Preceded by Ron Oden	Mayor of Palm Springs, California; December 5, 2007–December 9, 2015	Succeeded by Robert Moon
Preceded by Ginny Foat	Mayor Pro Tem of Palm Springs, California; December 6, 2006–December 5, 2007	Succeeded by Ginny Foat
Preceded by	Palm Springs City Council for the At Large District; December 3, 2003–December 5, 2007	Succeeded by
