= Statue of Lucille Ball (Palm Springs, California) =

Bronze sculpture in the U.S. state of California

- The sculpture in 2024
- Artist: Emmanuil and Janet Snitkovsky
- Year: 1995
- Medium: Bronze sculpture
- Subject: Lucille Ball
- Location: Palm Springs, California, U.S.; 33.8230°N 116.5465°W

A statue of Lucille Ball is installed in Palm Springs, California. Emmanuil and Janet Snitkovsky created the artwork in 1995.

== Description ==
The life-size bronze sculpture depicts Lucille Ball seated on a bench near the intersection of Palm Canyon Drive and Tahquitz Canyon Way in Palm Springs.

== See also ==
- List of public art in Palm Springs, California
