= Two Piece Reclining Figure No. 3 =

Sculpture by Henry Moore

- The sculpture outside the Palm Springs Art Museum, 2024
- Artist: Henry Moore

Two Piece Reclining Figure No. 3 is a 1963 artwork by Henry Moore.

A bronze edition (1/7) is part of the collection of the Palm Springs Art Museum.

== See also ==
- List of sculptures by Henry Moore
