= Robolights =

Art installation in California

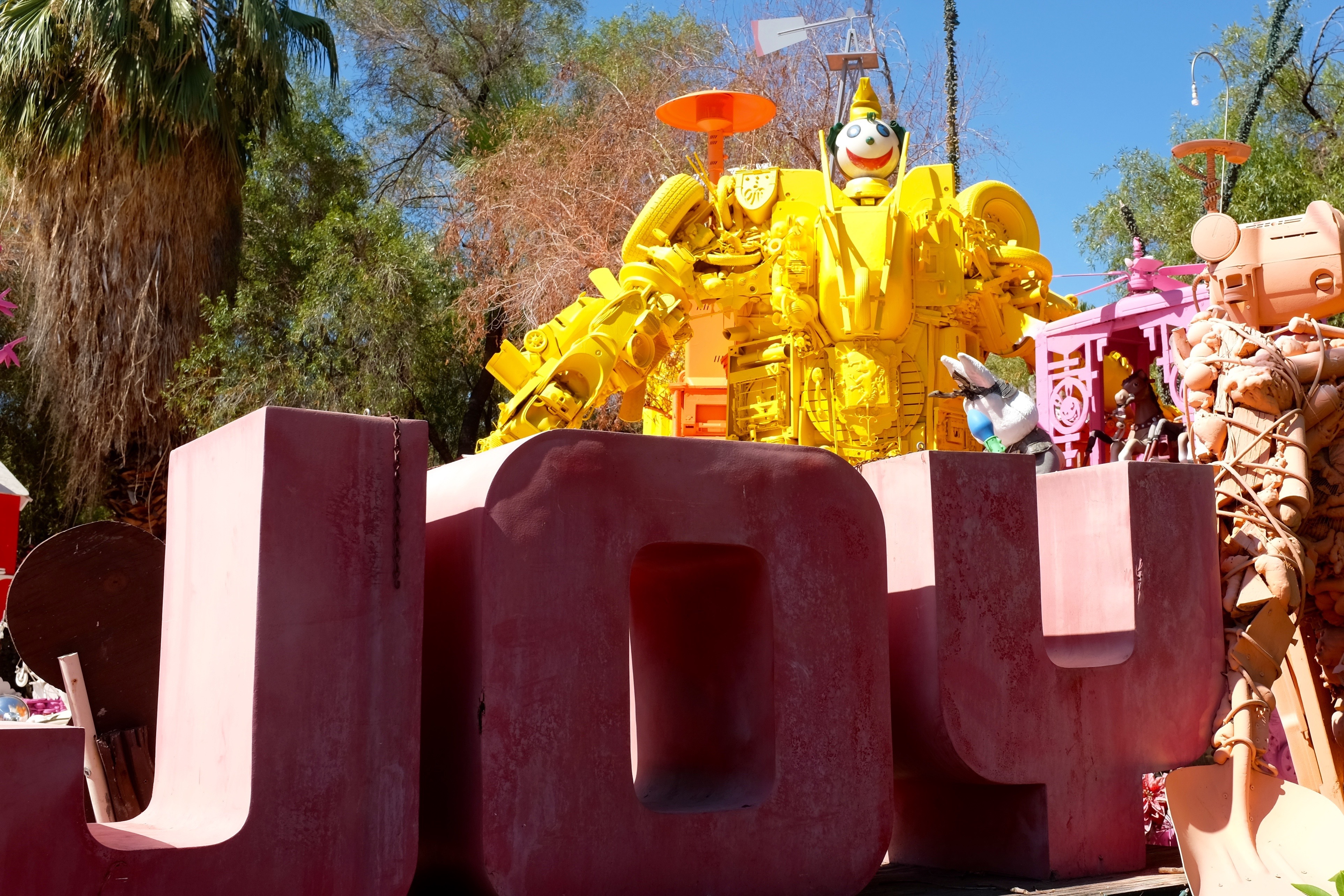
- The sculptures in 2017
- Artist: Kenny Irwin, Jr.
- Year: 1986
- Medium: Recycled materials
- Dimensions: 2 acres (0.81 ha) property
- Location: 33.8319°N 116.5353°W

Robolights is an art installation in Palm Springs, California. It consists of sculptures made by artist Kenny Irwin Jr. starting in 1986 and surround his house at 1077 E Granvia Valmonte. All the sculptures are made from recycled materials. It is a popular attraction during the holiday season in the winter, with around 63,000 visitors in 2017. It was estimated as the largest residential, private Christmas lights display in the United States.

== History ==
Kenny Irwin Jr. built his first outdoor sculpture, a 10-foot-tall (3.0 m) wooden robot, at age nine in 1983. He went on to develop a signature style of large, illuminated, multicolored robots. His father, Ken Irwin Sr., a real estate developer known for the Don Quixote-themed La Mancha Villas, allowed him to use the family home as a "canvas" for his work. Irwin began the installation in 1986, at age 12, and has continued building robots since, working about 350 days a year for 10–12 hours a day.

A vandal stole many Christmas lights and some sculptures were stolen in 2009. In 2012, the cost of running of the installation became too great and Irwin had to ask for donations online.

The city of Palm Springs sued Irwin in 2016 for violating the building code, as visitors were frequently annoying residents of nearby houses, generating noise, traffic, and trash. In that same year, an electrical fire broke out on the property due to a malfunctioning electric component of the pool. After the fire, the area was subject to inspections, and the city found that some statues on the roof were unauthorized. These statues could provide a potential danger if the wind blew them off. Because of this, the city ordered Irwin to close the property to the public. However, he did not comply, and he was brought to court. The case was eventually settled in 2017, with Irwin having to require a permit and pay for a program that would reduce trash and traffic. In 2018, Irwin agreed with the city to move his art to a more commercial location, with the city providing $125,000 to cover expenses. As of the 2023 season, the move has not occurred.
