= Sonny Bono =

American singer, record producer, comedian, actor, and politician (1935–1998)

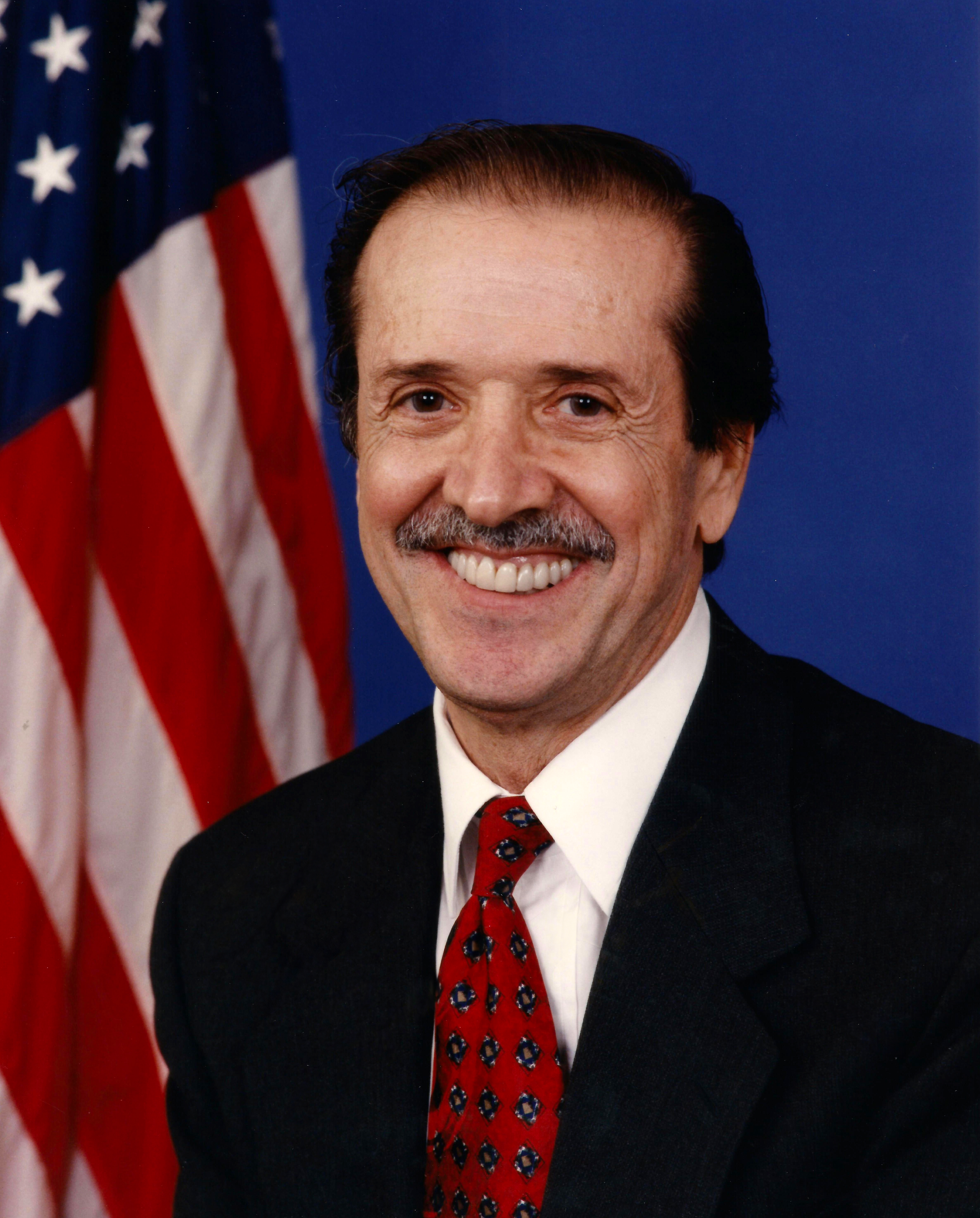
- Official portrait, 1995

Member of the U.S. House of Representatives from California's 44th district
- In office January 3, 1995 – January 5, 1998
- Preceded by: Al McCandless
- Succeeded by: Mary Bono

16th Mayor of Palm Springs
- In office April 1988 – April 1992
- Preceded by: Frank Bogert
- Succeeded by: Lloyd Maryanov

Personal details
- Born: Salvatore Phillip Bono; February 16, 1935 Detroit, Michigan, U.S.
- Died: January 5, 1998 (aged 62) South Lake Tahoe, California, U.S.
- Cause of death: Blunt trauma as a result of a skiing accident
- Resting place: Desert Memorial Park, Cathedral City, California, U.S.
- Party: Republican
- Spouses: Donna Rankin (m. 1954; div. 1962); Cher (m. 1969; div. 1975); Susie Coelho (m. 1981; div. 1984); Mary Whitaker (m. 1986)
- Children: 4, including Chaz
- Occupation: Singer; songwriter; record producer; actor; politician
- Musical career
- Origin: Inglewood, California, U.S.
- Genres: Pop; rock; folk
- Instruments: Vocals; percussion; ukulele; keyboards
- Years active: 1963–1998
- Formerly of: Sonny & Cher

Salvatore Phillip "Sonny" Bono (/ˈboʊnoʊ/ BOH-noh; February 16, 1935 – January 5, 1998) was an American singer, songwriter, record producer, actor, and politician. In partnership with his second wife, Cher, he formed the singing duo Sonny & Cher. A member of the Republican Party, Bono served as the 16th mayor of Palm Springs, California, from 1988 to 1992, and served as the U.S. representative for California's 44th district from 1995 until his death in 1998.

The United States Copyright Term Extension Act of 1998, which extended the term of copyright by 20 years, was named in honor of Bono when it was passed by Congress nine months after his death. Mary Bono (his widow and successor in Congress) had been one of the original sponsors of the legislation, commonly known as the Sonny Bono Copyright Term Extension Act.

== Early life ==
Bono was born in Detroit, the son of Zena "Jean" (née DiMercurio) and Santo Bono. His father was born in Montelepre, Palermo, Italy; his mother was also of Italian descent. His mother called him "Sono" as a term of endearment, which evolved over time into "Sonny". Sonny was the youngest of three siblings; he had two sisters, Fran and Betty. The family moved to Inglewood, California, when he was seven, and his parents divorced soon afterwards. Bono decided early in life to become part of the music business, and began writing songs as a teenager. "Koko Joe", a song he wrote when he was 16, was recorded by Don and Dewey in 1958, and later covered by several other artists, including the Righteous Brothers. Bono attended Inglewood High School, but did not graduate, opting to drop out so he could begin to pursue a career as a songwriter and performer. He worked at a variety of jobs while trying to break into the music business, including waiter, truck driver, construction laborer, and butcher's helper.

== Career ==
=== Entertainment career ===
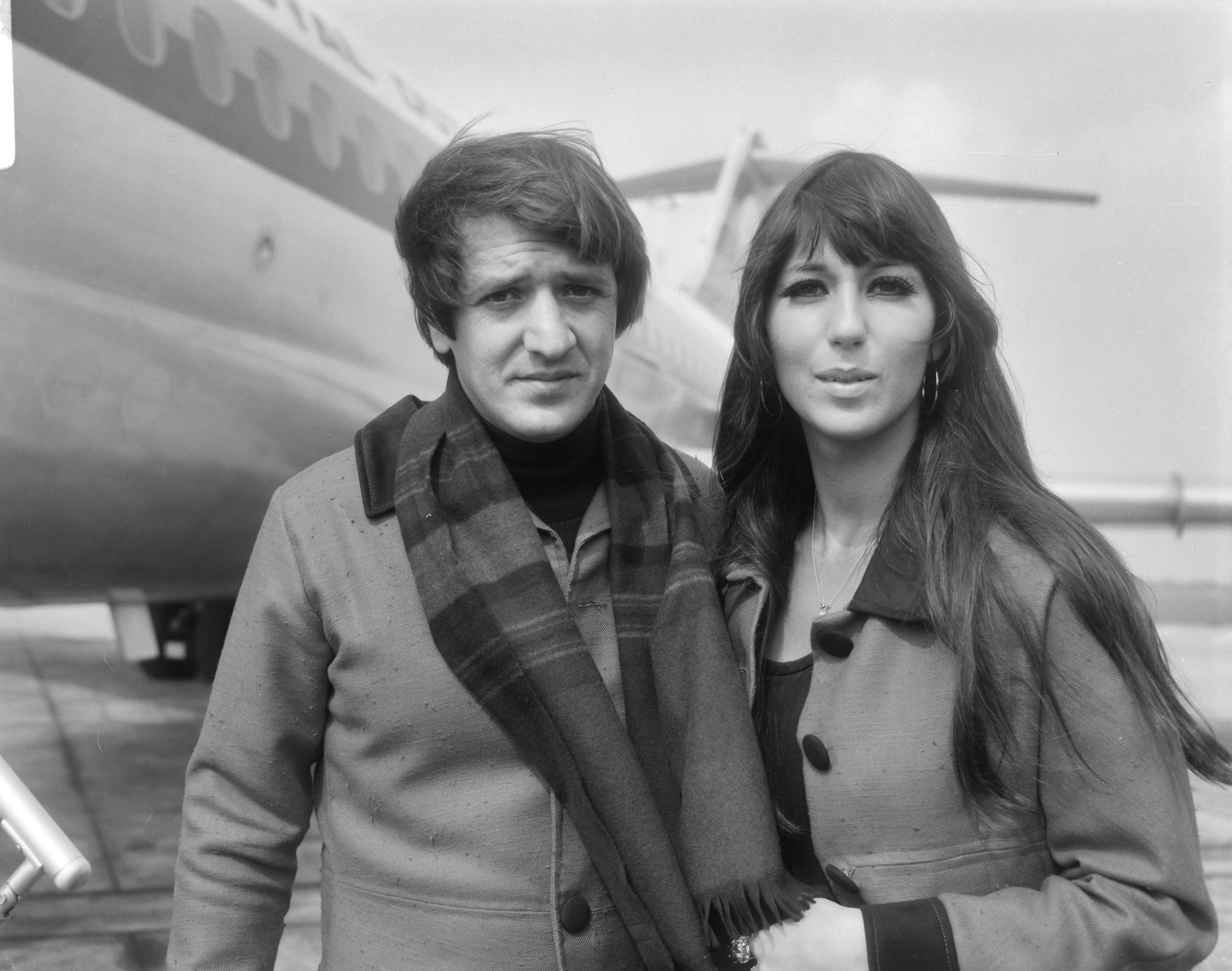
Sonny & Cher, 1966

Bono began his music career as a songwriter at Specialty Records, where his song "Things You Do to Me" was recorded by Sam Cooke; he went on to work for record producer Phil Spector in the early 1960s as a promotion man, percussionist and "gofer". One of his earliest songwriting efforts, "Needles and Pins", was co-written with Jack Nitzsche, another member of Spector's production team. In 1965, he achieved commercial success with his wife Cher in the singing duo Sonny & Cher. Bono wrote, arranged and produced a number of hit records for the duo, including the singles "I Got You Babe" and "The Beat Goes On", although Cher received more attention as a performer. He played a major part in Cher's early solo recording career, writing and producing singles including "Bang Bang" and "You Better Sit Down Kids".

Under a pseudonym, Bono co-wrote "She Said Yeah", covered by the Rolling Stones on their 1965 LP Out of Our Heads. His lone hit single as a solo artist, "Laugh at Me", was released in 1965 and peaked at No. 10 on the Billboard Hot 100. In live concerts, Bono introduced the song by saying "I'd like to sing a medley of my hit". "Laugh at Me" was also covered by Mott The Hoople on their first album, released in 1969. His only other single as a solo artist, "The Revolution Kind", reached No. 70 on the Billboard Hot 100 later that year. His solo album, Inner Views, was released in 1967.

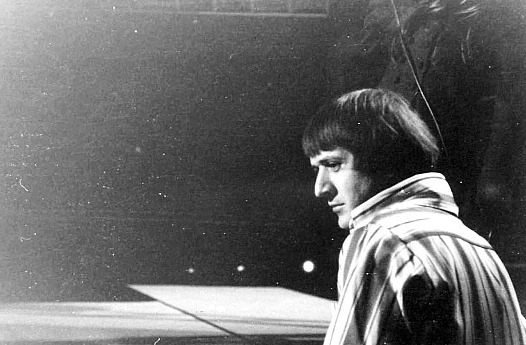
Sonny Bono in 1966 during a performance

Bono continued to work with Cher through the early and mid-1970s, starring in a popular television variety show, The Sonny & Cher Comedy Hour, which ran on CBS from 1971 to 1974. Around the time that The Sonny and Cher Comedy Hour was in development, Bono grew his now famous mustache, which he would continue to wear for the rest of his life. In 1974, his solo variety show, The Sonny Comedy Revue, ran on ABC for one season. From 1976 to 1977, the duo, since divorced, returned to perform together on The Sonny and Cher Show. Their last appearance together was on Late Night with David Letterman on November 13, 1987, on which they sang "I Got You Babe".

"What we call a hook hits you, ... then you're almost not writing, lyrics come to you, a sort of magic takes over, and it's not like work at all."

— Sonny Bono on songwriting, 1967 Pop Chronicles interview.

In 2011, Sonny Bono was inducted into the Michigan Rock and Roll Legends Hall of Fame.

==== Film and television ====
Bono's acting career included bit parts as a guest performer in such television series as The Man From U.N.C.L.E. (appearing with Cher in "The Hot Number Affair"), Fantasy Island, Charlie's Angels, The Love Boat, Matt Houston, The Six Million Dollar Man and CHiPs. In the 1975 TV movie Murder on Flight 502, he played the role of rock star Jack Marshall. He appeared in the 1980 miniseries Top of the Hill. He played the role of mad bomber Joe Selucci in Airplane II: The Sequel (1982) and played the role of Peter Dickinson in the 1986 horror film Troll. He portrayed racist entrepreneur Franklin Von Tussle in the John Waters film Hairspray (1988). He appeared as the Mayor of Palm Springs (which he was at the time) in several episodes of P.S. I Luv U during the 1991–92 TV season and on Lois & Clark: The New Adventures of Superman (in season 1, episode 9 "The Man of Steel Bars", which aired November 21, 1993), he played Mayor Frank Berkowitz. He made a minor appearance as himself in the comedy film First Kid (1996). A portrait of Bono appeared in the VeggieTales episode "Dave and the Giant Pickle", in the Silly Songs with Larry segment "I Love My Lips" (original version).

Bono guest-starred as himself on The Golden Girls season 6 episode "Mrs. George Devereaux" (originally broadcast November 17, 1990), in which he vied with Lyle Waggoner for Dorothy Zbornak's (Bea Arthur) affection in a dream sequence. In Blanche Deveraux's (Rue McClanahan) dream, her husband George (George Grizzard) is still alive and Bono uses his power as Mayor of Palm Springs to have Waggoner falsely arrested so he can have Dorothy to himself. Sophia Petrillo (Estelle Getty) had been hoping for Bono and Dorothy to get together and actively supported Bono.

=== Political career ===
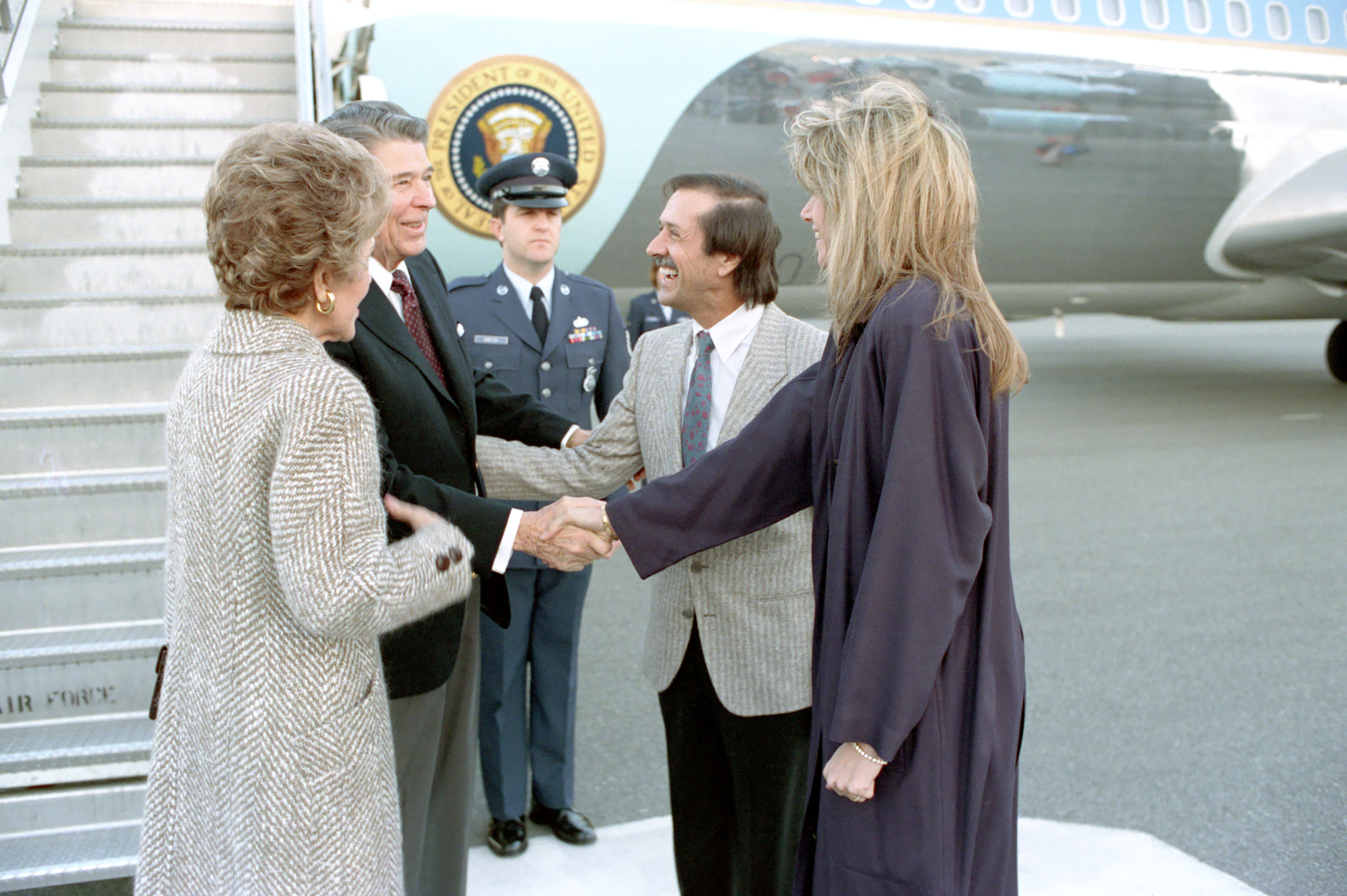
President Ronald Reagan and First Lady Nancy Reagan are greeted by Sonny Bono and Mary Bono on their arrival via Air Force One in Palm Springs, California, December 29, 1988.

Bono entered politics after experiencing frustration with local government bureaucracy while trying to open a restaurant in Palm Springs, California. He made a successful bid for mayor and served from 1988 to 1992. As mayor, Bono spearheaded the creation of the Palm Springs International Film Festival, which is held each year in his memory.

Bono ran for the Republican nomination for United States Senate in 1992, but lost to the more conservative Bruce Herschensohn, who lost the general election to Democrat Barbara Boxer. Bono and Herschensohn became close friends after the campaign. In 1994, Bono planned to run for Lieutenant Governor, but decided to run for Congress when Republican Al McCandless announced his retirement. Bono won the Republican nomination and the general election to represent California's 44th congressional district. He was reelected in 1996 and served from January 1995 until his death in January 1998.

In the House, Bono was one of 12 co-sponsors of a House bill extending the length of terms for copyright protection. Although that bill was never voted on in the Senate, a similar Senate bill was passed after his death and named the Sonny Bono Copyright Term Extension Act in his memory. It is also known (derisively) as the Mickey Mouse Protection Act.

He championed the restoration of the Salton Sea, bringing the giant lake's plight to national attention. In 1998, then Speaker of the House Newt Gingrich made a public appearance and speech at the shore of the lake on Bono's behalf.

In their book Tell Newt to Shut Up, David Maraniss and Michael Weisskopf credit Bono with being the first person to recognize Gingrich's public relations problems in 1995. Drawing on his long experience as a celebrity and entertainment producer, Bono (according to Maraniss and Weisskopf) recognized that Gingrich's status had changed from politician to celebrity and that he was not making allowances for that change:

You're a celebrity now... The rules are different for celebrities. I know it. I've been there. I've been a celebrity. I used to be a bigger celebrity. But let me tell you, you're not being handled right. This is not political news coverage. This is celebrity status. You need handlers. You need to understand what you're doing. You need to understand the attitude of the media toward celebrities.

Bono remains the only member of Congress to have scored a number-one pop single on the US Billboard Hot 100 chart.

== Personal life ==
Bono was a godparent of Anthony Kiedis of the band Red Hot Chili Peppers; he was a close friend of Kiedis's father, Blackie Dammett.

=== Marriages ===
Bono was married four times. He married his first wife, Donna Rankin, on November 3, 1954. Their daughter Christine ("Christy") was born on June 24, 1958. They divorced in 1962.

In 1964, Bono and Cheryl Sarkisian, later known as singer and actress Cher, had an unofficial wedding. The couple legally married in 1969 after the birth of their child, who later, as a trans man legally changed his name to Chaz Salvatore Bono. Bono and Cher ended their romantic relationship in 1972 but remained married to maintain their public image. Their marriage had deteriorated due to Sonny's infidelity and controlling behavior. By 1973, they were still sharing a home but were dating other people. After competing legal filings in 1974 and a bitter custody battle, they finalized their divorce in 1975. Despite the turmoil, they eventually co-parented amicably, and Bono later apologized to Cher for how he treated her.

On New Year's Eve 1981, Bono married actress-model Susie Coelho. They divorced in 1984.

In 1986, he married Mary Whitaker. The couple had two children: son Chesare Elan in 1988 and daughter Chianna Maria in 1991. Mary was widowed by Sonny's death.

=== Salton Sea ===
Bono was a champion of the Salton Sea in southeastern California, where a park was named in his honor. The 2005 documentary film Plagues & Pleasures on the Salton Sea (narrated by John Waters) features Bono and documented the lives of the inhabitants of Bombay Beach, Niland and Salton City, as well as the ecological issues associated with the Sea.

=== Religion ===
He became interested in Scientology and took Scientology courses partly because of the influence of Mimi Rogers, but stated that he was a Roman Catholic on all official documents, campaign materials and websites. His wife Mary also took Scientology courses. However, after his death, Mary Bono stated that "Sonny did try to break away [from the Church of Scientology] at one point, and they made it very difficult for him." The Church of Scientology said there was no estrangement from Bono.

== Death ==
External videos
- Memorial Service, U.S. Capitol, January 28, 1998, C-SPAN

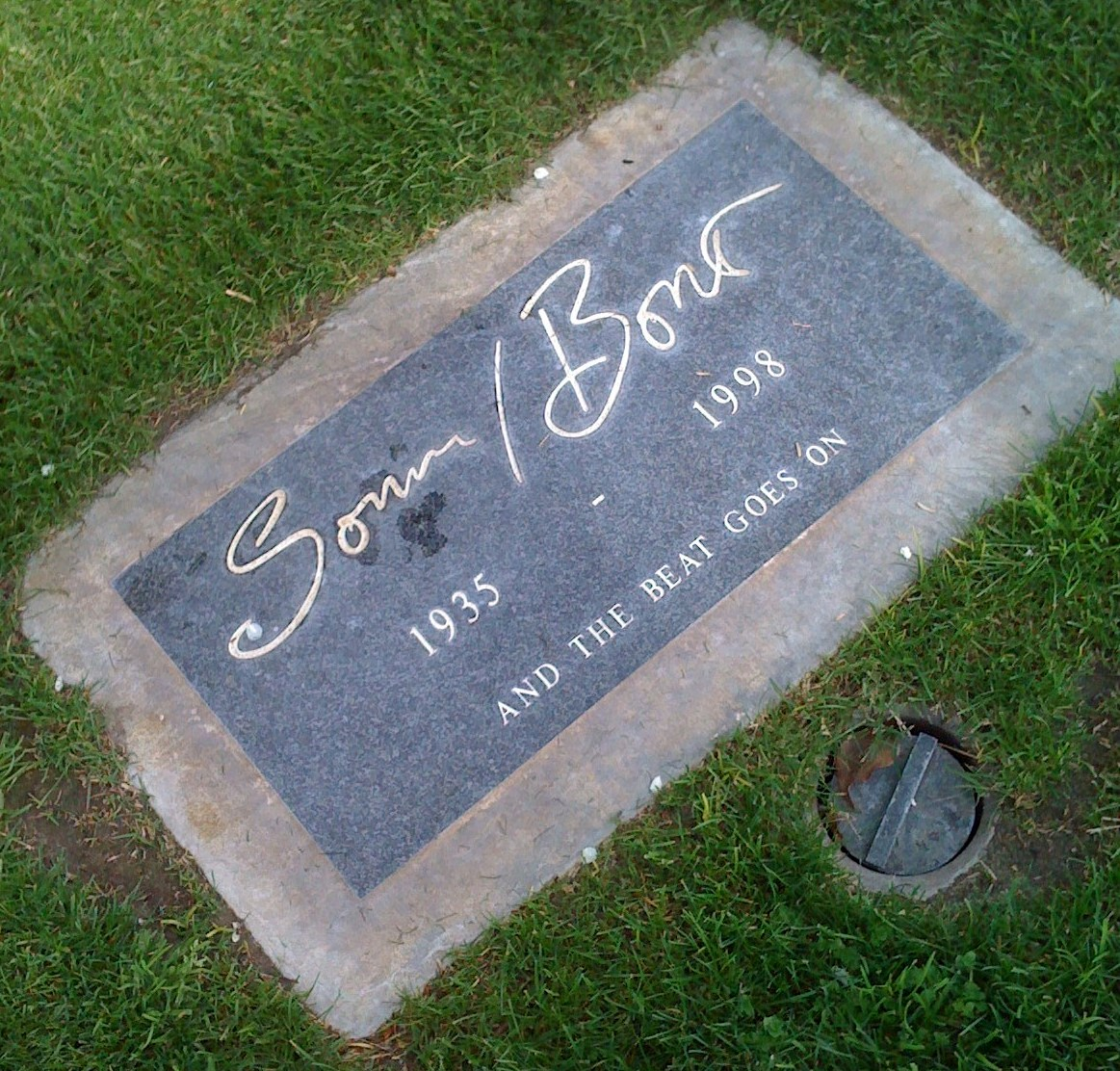
Sonny Bono's headstone at Desert Memorial Park

On the afternoon of January 5, 1998, Bono crashed into a tree and died at the age of 62 while skiing at Heavenly Mountain Resort in South Lake Tahoe, California. His body was discovered later that day in the section of the resort over the Nevada state line; it was concluded that he died immediately upon impact.

Sonny's funeral was held on January 10, 1998, at St. Theresa's Church in Palm Springs. Attendees included Cher, Governor Pete Wilson, former president Gerald Ford, Speaker of the House Newt Gingrich, and Secretary of the Interior Bruce Babbitt, as the representative of the White House. He was buried at Desert Memorial Park in Cathedral City, California. His headstone reads "AND THE BEAT GOES ON".

Mary Bono was elected to fill the remainder of her husband's congressional term. She was elected in her own right seven subsequent times before being defeated in the 2012 election.

== Honors and tributes ==
Sonny Bono has been honored and memorialized with:

- A Golden Palm Star on the Palm Springs Walk of Stars: dedicated to him in 1996.
- Sonny Bono Copyright Term Extension Act: Extended copyright protections effective October 27, 1998.
- Sonny Bono Salton Sea National Wildlife Refuge: a nature reserve on the Salton Sea was renamed in Bono's honor in 1998.
- Sonny Bono Memorial Park, a small park in Washington, D.C., was named in his honor in 1998.
- Sonny Bono Memorial Interchange: an interchange on California State Route 60 at Nason Street in Moreno Valley, California, was named for Bono in September 2000.
- Sonny Bono Memorial Freeway: a 40-mile stretch of Interstate 10 near Palm Springs was dedicated January 10, 2002.
- Sonny Bono Concourse: a concourse at Palm Springs International Airport dedicated October 22, 2002.
- Statue of Sonny Bono: Located in downtown Palm Springs, California, the statue was dedicated in November 2001.
- Sonny Bono Visionary Award: An award to honor Bono was started in 2004 at the Palm Springs International Film Festival. Sidney Sheldon was honored by Mary Bono at the 2004 Palm Springs International Film Festival.

== Electoral history ==
Palm Springs mayoral election, 1988
| Candidate | Votes | % |
|---|---|---|
| Sonny Bono | 4,842 | 44.29 |
| Lloyd Maryanov | 2,498 | 22.85 |
| Deyna Hodges | 1,934 | 17.69 |
| Eli Birer | 1,140 | 10.43 |
| Ray Patencio | 462 | 4.23 |
| Lewis Friedman | 27 | 0.25 |
| Neil Beatty | 21 | 0.19 |
| Total votes | 10,924 | 100.00 |

1992 U.S. Senate election in California, Republican primary
| Party | Candidate | Votes | % |
|---|---|---|---|
| Republican | Bruce Herschensohn | 956,146 | 38.80 |
| Republican | Tom Campbell | 859,970 | 34.90 |
| Republican | Sonny Bono | 417,848 | 16.96 |
| Republican | Isaac Park Yonker | 94,623 | 3.84 |
| Republican | Alexander Swift Justice | 60,104 | 2.44 |
| Republican | John W. Spring | 54,941 | 2.23 |
| Republican | John M. Brown | 20,810 | 0.84 |
| Total votes | | 2,464,442 | 100.00 |

California's 44th congressional district election, 1994
Primary election
| Party | Candidate | Votes | % |
|---|---|---|---|
| Republican | Sonny Bono | 25,709 | 48.63 |
| Republican | Patricia "Corky" Larson | 14,897 | 28.18 |
| Republican | Kent DeLong | 5,746 | 10.87 |
| Republican | Phil Bretz | 2,883 | 5.45 |
| Republican | A.J. "Bud" Mathewson | 2,256 | 4.27 |
| Republican | Lewis A. Silva | 1,378 | 2.61 |
| Total votes | | 52,869 | 100.00 |
General election
| Republican | Sonny Bono | 95,521 | 55.61 |
| Democratic | Steve Clute | 65,370 | 38.06 |
| American Independent | Donald Cochran | 10,885 | 6.34 |
| Total votes | | 171,776 | 100.00 |
| Republican hold | | | |

California's 44th congressional district election, 1996
| Party | Candidate | Votes | % |
|---|---|---|---|
| Republican | Sonny Bono (incumbent) | 110,643 | 57.74 |
| Democratic | Anita Rufus | 73,844 | 38.54 |
| American Independent | Donald Cochran | 3,888 | 2.03 |
| Natural Law | Karen Blasdell-Wilkinson | 3,143 | 1.64 |
| Write-In | A.J. "Bud" Mathewson | 110 | 0.06 |
| Total votes | | 191,628 | 100.00 |

== See also ==
- List of actor-politicians
- List of skiing deaths
- List of members of the United States Congress who died in office (1950–1999)

Political offices
| Preceded by Frank Bogert | Mayor of Palm Springs, California; April 1988 – April 1992 | Succeeded by Lloyd Maryanov |
U.S. House of Representatives
| Preceded by Al McCandless | Member of the U.S. House of Representatives from California's 44th congressional district January 3, 1995 – January 5, 1998 | Succeeded by Mary Bono |
