= Reclining Figure 1956 =

Sculpture by Henry Moore

- The sculpture outside the Palm Springs Art Museum in 2024
- Artist: Henry Moore

Reclining Figure (LH402) is a 1956 sculpture by British artist Henry Moore. The sculpture was cast in an edition of 8 (+ 1 artist copy) in 1961–63.

The original 1956 plaster was gifted to the Art Gallery of Ontario, Toronto, Canada, by the artist.

== Casts ==
- cast 1: Academy of Arts, Berlin, Germany
- cast 3: Palm Springs Art Museum, California, US
- cast 4: Sainsbury Institute for Art, University of East Anglia, Norwich, UK
- cast 5: Art Gallery of Western Australia, Perth, Australia
- cast 8: Norton Simon Museum, Pasadena, California, US
- cast ?: Donald M. Kendall Sculpture Gardens, Purchase, New York, US

The sculpture (cast 6) was sold for over $5 million at Christie's New York auction in 2012.

== See also ==
- List of sculptures by Henry Moore
