= Artificial Rock Number 131 =

Sculpture by Zhan Wang in Palm Springs, California, U.S.

Artificial Rock #131
- The sculpture outside the Palm Springs Art Museum in 2024
- Artist: Zhan Wang
- Year: 2012
- Medium: Stainless steel sculpture
- Location: Palm Springs, California, U.S.
- 33.8242°N 116.5495°W

Artificial Rock #131 is a 2012 metal sculpture by Zhan Wang, permanently installed outside the Palm Springs Art Museum, in Palm Springs, California. The stainless steel sculpture is based on "scholar's rocks" in traditional Chinese gardening. Palm Springs Life said the work "is as eye-catching as it is monumental".
