= Curt Mattson =

Finnish sailor

Personal information
- Birth name: Curt Gustav Mauritz Mattson
- Nationality: Finnish
- Born: 30 October 1900; Mariehamn, Grand Duchy of Finland
- Died: 13 July 1965 (aged 64); Hanko, Finland

Curt Gustav Mauritz Mattson (30 October 1900 – 13 July 1965) was a Finnish sailor. He competed in the mixed 6 metres at the 1936 Summer Olympics.
