= Statue of Sonny Bono =

Outdoor sculpture in Palm Springs, California, U.S.

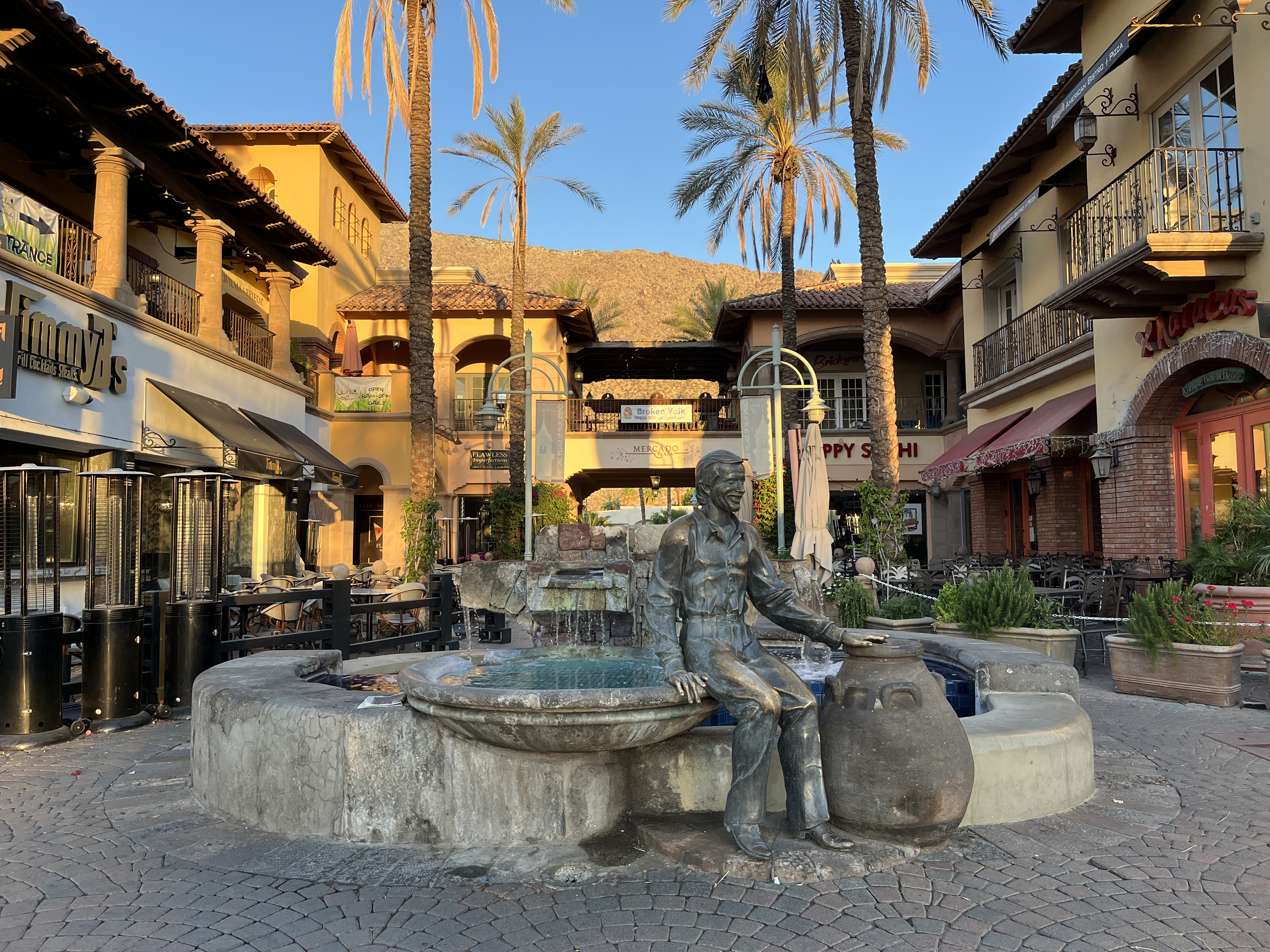
- The statue in 2024
- Subject: Sonny Bono
- Location: Palm Springs, California, U.S.; 33.8220°N 116.5469°W

A statue of musician and former Congressman Sonny Bono, sometimes called the Sonny Bono Memorial Fountain, is installed at Plaza Mercado, in Palm Springs, California. It was made by sculptor Emmanuel Snitkovsky.

== Description and history ==
A life-size bronze statue in the likeness of Sonny Bono, a former mayor of Palm Springs, California and member of the United States House of Representatives, is installed at the entrance to downtown's Plaza Mercado. It was installed in 2001.
