= List of mayors of Palm Springs, California =

Mayor of Palm Springs
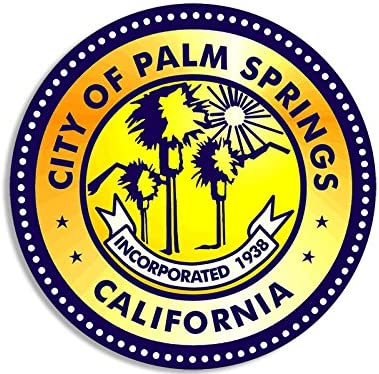
- Palm Springs Seal

- Palm Springs Flag

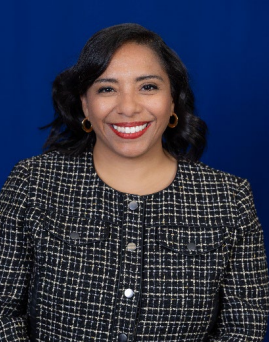
- Incumbent; Naomi Soto since December 10, 2025
- Style: Madam Mayor
- Term length: Four years
- Inaugural holder: Philip L. Boyd
- Formation: 1938
- Website: "Office of the Mayor".

Mayor Elect David Ready

The mayor of Palm Springs, California is a largely ceremonial title, elected at-large, with no executive functions. The mayor is the chair of the city council meetings. The legislative body is the five-member city council, which is voted into office by public elections. The Council appoints a professional manager to oversee the administrative operations, implement its policies, and advise it. The city of Palm Springs is a council-manager type government.

The office of mayor was created in 1938 when Palm Springs was officially established as a city. Palm Springs residents voted on the issue of incorporation and for the first members of the city council on April 12, 1938. There were 910 registered voters in the city. Voters cast their ballots 442 in favor and 211 opposed. Upon certification of the election results the city's incorporation was finalized on April 20, 1938.

The mayor was not directly elected until 1982 and stopped being directly elected in 2019. The mayor's role is now largely ceremonial and rotates annually among council members elected from five different districts. There are no term limits for the members of the city council.

This is a list of mayors of Palm Springs, California.

#	Mayor	Picture	Term(s)	Notes	Significant civic events during term(s) of office
1	Philip L. Boyd		April 1938 – April 1942	First mayor appointed under the original city charter. The city was 16 square miles and represented by seven wards.	Fire Protection District dissolved and Palm Springs Fire Department formed; City establishes Palm Springs Public Library, July 5, 1939; The Welwood Murray Memorial Library opens February 19, 1941; Palm Springs High School opens; students no longer travel to Banning
2	Frank V. Shannon		April 1942 – April 1944		The 21st Ferrying Group of the USAAF Air Transport Command occupies PS Muni Airport – April 1942; General Torney General Hospital opens in the former El Mirador Hotel – October 12, 1942; 459th Force Support Squadron joins the 21st Ferrying Group – October 28, 1942
3	Eugene E. Therieau		April 1944 – April 1946		Thomas A. O'Donnell donates the O'Donnell Golf Course to the city, which names it the Thomas A. O'Donnell Municipal Park (1944–1945)
4	Clarence E. Hyde		April 1946 – April 1948		Executed Lease Agreement No. 209 between the City of Palm Springs and the O'Donnell Golf Club on July 1, 1947. Lease ends on December 26, 2043
5	Charles Farrell		April 1948 – July 1953		The Committee of Twenty-Five formed to promote civic activities and sponsor visits of influential and important persons in business
6	Florian Boyd		July 1953 – November 1957		Boyd joined Governor Goodwin Knight in welcoming President and Mrs. Eisenhower to PS on their way to Smoke Tree Ranch as guests of businessman Paul Helms; City rejects the Agua Caliente's land-use strategy plan for Section 14 prepared by Victor Gruen and Associates claiming it would "pull business away from downtown Palm Springs"; New City Hall, designed by architect Albert Frey, opens
7	Gerald K. Sanborn		November 1957 – April 1958	Acting mayor	
8	Frank Bogert		April 1958 – January 1966		City purchases land from Agua Caliente Indians for present day airport; New Police Station opens on McCallum Way, October 12, 1959; Municipal Golf Course opens with 18 holes on October 28, 1959; President John F. Kennedy visits Palm Springs on December 9, 1962; City authorizes the demolition and razing of homes and structures on the Agua Caliente Reservation in Section 14 – February 19, 1962; Vista del Monte Park (present day Victoria Park) and neighboring Fire Station dedicated on November 15, 1964
9	George Beebe, Jr.		January 1966 – April 1966	Acting mayor	
10	Edgar L. McCoubrey		April 1966 – April 1967		City installs the Pearl McCallum McManus fountain at PS Airport. McCoubrey voted against funding it.
11	Howard Wiefels		April 1967 – March 1974		Proposition R provided funding for the following projects: Sunrise Park; PS Public Library; Leisure Center; The Pavilion; PS Swim Center; Desert Highland Park (present day James O. Jessie Park); Community Center; Gymnasium; Playground and baseball field
12	William Foster		April 1974 – March 1977		PS Tennis Center opens; PS Library Center opens on October 28, 1975; PS Library Dedication featured U.S. Senator S. I. Hayakawa, December 7, 1975
13	Russ Beirich		March 1977 – April 1980		PS Police Training Center is dedicated on April 17, 1977
14	John Doyle		April 1980 – April 1982	Last appointed mayor under the original seven wards	
15	Frank Bogert		April 1982 – April 1988	First directly elected mayor under the four at-large council	New Police Department building on South Civic Drive dedicated August 21, 1985; PS Convention Center opens on December 31, 1987
16	Sonny Bono		April 1988 – April 1992		Library reinstated as a full Municipal Department through the efforts of Library Board President Kleindienst on October 3, 1990; Fire destroys the historic El Mirador Tower – July 26, 1989; Created Palm Springs International Film Festival. Debuts on January 10, 1990; The downtown redevelopment plan called "Vision Palm Springs" presented on May 16, 1990; Grand opening of the restored El Mirador Tower designed by architect Chris Mills – November 10, 1990; Vintage Grand Prix returns as the Palm Springs Road Races – November 15–18, 1990; Villagefest Street Fair debuts on February 28, 1991; Mizell Senior Center opens, designed by architect Chris Mills – March 14, 1991
17	Lloyd Maryanov		April 1992 – December 1995	Date for elections moved from April to November to coincide with state and nation election cycles.	Mid-Valley Parkway; Welwood Murray Memorial Library is closed by Library Board on June 30, 1992; Residents vote to abandon status as a General Law city to become a Charter Law city; Implemented 5% Utility User Tax (UUT); Tahquitz Creek Golf Resort is completed by the city making it Palm Springs' second publicly owned course – February 4, 1995.
18	William G. Kleindienst		December 1995 – December 1999; December 1999 – December 2003	First two-term directly elected mayor	Library creates the Palm Springs Virtual University (PSVU) offering college courses via the internet with video-teleconferencing from UCLA, CSU San Bernardino, Stanford and other universities. Dedicated December 3, 1998.; PS Amtrak Station opens 1999; Sonny Bono Concourse at Palm Springs International Airport; City acquires Albert Frey designed Tramway Gas Station for new Visitors Center – December 7, 2002; Citywide playground equipment replacement; PS Boxing Club reopens with a $50,000 city funding grant; PS Skate Park; PS Dog Park is opened. "Desert Reflections", the Dog Park Fence, was funded as a Public Art program and designed by Artist Phill Evans; Downtown parking structure; Palm Springs Convention Center expansion; Dinah Shore bridge; Created the Council Cabinet; Privatized tourism operations with SMG; City privatized waste water treatment facility operation with US Filter/Vivendi; Privatized PS Tennis Center operations with the Plaza Racquet Club; Dedication of "The Nude Bridge"; Congressman Sonny Bono dies in skiing accident near Lake Tahoe; Sonny Bono Memorial Fountain by sculpture Emmanuil Snitkovsky is dedicated, 2001; Community-based parades created: Festival of Lights Parade Kleindienst is the parade founder.; Veterans Day Parade and concert; Homecoming Parade
19	Ron Oden		December 2003 – December 2007	First African-American and openly gay mayor	"Cirque Dreams" premiers in a temporary theater downtown – November 18, 2005; Oden loses Democratic primary bid for State Assembly to Steve Clute – November 7, 2006; "Cirque Dreams" shut down in its second season without repaying the city the $300,000 interest-free loan; College of the Desert Board of Trustees voted unanimously to bring future West Valley Campus to Palm Springs – September 22, 2007; Airport opens new Regional Air Terminal
20	Steve Pougnet		December 2007 – December 2015	Second openly gay mayor of Palm Springs	Pougnet lays out plans for The Hard Rock Hotel and the Mondrian Hotel; Pougnet loses bid to unseat Rep. Mary Bono Mack on November 2, 2010 election; Pougnet reveals "iHub" (innovation hub) to invest in new green businesses to locate in city; Pougnet proposed renaming the "Pearl McManus Fountain" at Palm Springs International Airport after Mayor Frank Bogert.; Pougnet proposes an initiative for a 1% sales tax (Measure J) to help city buy and develop downtown Fashion Plaza Mall – December 16, 2010; Measure J passes with 58% approval – November 8, 2011
21	Robert Moon		December 2015 – December 2019	Last directly elected mayor of Palm Springs under the four at-large council	Council saves historic Tahquitz Plaza from demolition. Restored and repurposed complex renamed Kaptur Plaza in honor of its prominent Palm Springs mid-century architect Hugh Kaptur.; Palm Springs passes comprehensive City Ordinance to permit and regulate cannabis production, testing, and distribution. Cannabis lounges permitted.; Moon leads move of Walk of Stars program to Chamber of Commerce.; College of the Desert announces new Palm Springs Campus on site of old Palm Springs Mall; New Kimpton Rowan Hotel and retail development completed and opens on site of razed Fashion Plaza Mall; Palm Springs residents vote to allow vacation rentals in the City of Palm Springs under strict new legal controls; Moon and Councilmember JR Roberts organize "Rebirth of an Icon" project to begin fundraising for restoration of the historic 1936 Plaza Theatre in downtown Palm Springs; In a 3-to-2 vote, council votes to change from direct elections of at-large mayor and four councilmembers to five districts, with the title of mayor rotating between councilmembers each year.
22	Geoff Kors		December 2019- December 2020	First district rotated appointed mayor under the five district council and Fourth openly gay mayor of Palm Springs	City response and first phase of COVID-19 pandemic
23	Christy Holstege		December 2020– December 2021	First female, millennial, and openly bisexual mayor of Palm Springs	City second phase of COVID-19 pandemic
24	Lisa Middleton		December 2021 – December 2022	First openly transgender mayor of Palm Springs	City third and last phase of COVID-19 pandemic
25	Grace Elena Garner		December 2022 – December 2023	First Latina mayor of Palm Springs	
26	Jeffrey Bernstein		December 2023 – December 2024	Fifth openly gay mayor of Palm Springs	Section 14 eviction payout passed the city council 5-to-0 on November 14, 2024
27	Ron deHarte		December 2024 – December 2025	Sixth openly gay mayor of Palm Springs	
28	Naomi Soto		December 2025 – Present	Second Latina mayor of Palm Springs	

== See also ==
- Palm Springs Walk of Stars – which has "Golden Palm Stars" dedicated to former mayors Farrell, Bogert, Foster, Bono and Oden.
- List of people from Palm Springs, California
