= National Register of Historic Places listings in Riverside County, California =

Location of Riverside County in California

This is a list of the National Register of Historic Places listings in Riverside County, California.

This is intended to be a complete list of the properties and districts on the National Register of Historic Places in Riverside County, California, United States. Latitude and longitude coordinates are provided for many National Register properties and districts; these locations may be seen together in an online map.

There are 104 properties and districts listed on the National Register in the county, including 2 National Historic Landmarks.

This National Park Service list is complete through NPS recent listings posted September 4, 2026.

== Current listings ==
	Name on the Register	Image	Date listed	Location	City or town	Description
1	Administration Building, Sherman Institute	Administration Building, Sherman Institute	January 9, 1980 (#80000831)	9010 Magnolia Ave. 33°55′30″N 117°26′15″W	Riverside	
2	Dr. Franz Alexander House	Dr. Franz Alexander House	March 22, 2016 (#16000093)	1011 W. Cielo Dr. 33°50′44″N 116°33′35″W	Palm Springs	
3	All Souls Universalist Church	All Souls Universalist Church	September 18, 1978 (#78000736)	3657 Lemon St. 33°58′56″N 117°22′14″W	Riverside	
4	Andreas Canyon		January 8, 1973 (#73000422)	Address Restricted	Palm Springs	
5	Archeological Sites CA-RIV-504 and CA-RIV-773		March 12, 2003 (#03000121)	Address Restricted	Blythe	
6	Arlington Branch Library and Fire Hall	Arlington Branch Library and Fire Hall	July 22, 1993 (#93000668)	9556 Magnolia Ave. 33°55′11″N 117°26′48″W	Riverside	
7	Armory Hall	Armory Hall	January 29, 1992 (#91002032)	252 N. Main St. 33°40′15″N 117°19′32″W	Lake Elsinore	
8	Barker Dam	Barker Dam	October 29, 1975 (#75000173)	SE of Twentynine Palms in Joshua Tree National Park; 34°01′52″N 116°08′39″W	Twentynine Palms	
9	Miles C. Bates House	Miles C. Bates House	March 26, 2018 (#100002238)	73697 Santa Rosa Way; 33°43′40″N 116°22′45″W	Palm Desert	
10	Bel Vista House No. 2	Bel Vista House No. 2	October 20, 2020 (#100005718)	1520 East Tachevah Dr. 33°50′15″N 116°31′47″W	Palm Springs	
11	Bel Vista House No. 3	Bel Vista House No. 3	March 21, 2024 (#100010094)	1150 N. Calle Rolph; 33°50′19″N 116°31′47″W	Palm Springs	
12	Blythe Intaglios	Blythe Intaglios	August 22, 1975 (#75000452)	Address Restricted	Blythe	
13	Buttercup Farms Pictograph		May 3, 1976 (#76000509)	Address Restricted	Perris	
14	Cabot's Old Indian Pueblo Museum	Cabot's Old Indian Pueblo Museum	March 2, 2012 (#11000942)	67-616 E. Desert View Ave. 33°57′29″N 116°28′56″W	Desert Hot Springs	
15	Carey House	Carey House	September 28, 2015 (#15000635)	651 W. Via Escuela; 33°50′55″N 116°33′18″W	Palm Springs	
16	Andrew Carnegie Library		June 29, 1977 (#77000324)	8th and Main Sts. 33°52′23″N 117°33′56″W	Corona	Demolished in 1978
17	William Childs House	William Childs House	July 28, 1999 (#99000895)	1151 Monte Vista Dr. 33°57′32″N 117°20′11″W	Riverside	
18	Chinatown		March 1, 1990 (#90000151)	Brockton and Tequesquite Aves. 33°58′35″N 117°23′05″W	Riverside	
19	Coachella Valley Fish Traps	Coachella Valley Fish Traps	June 13, 1972 (#72000247)	Address Restricted	Valerie	
20	Coachella Valley Savings No. 1	Coachella Valley Savings No. 1	December 27, 2016 (#16000884)	383 S. Palm Canyon Dr. 33°49′04″N 116°32′49″W	Palm Springs	
21	Coachella Valley Savings No. 2	Coachella Valley Savings No. 2	December 27, 2016 (#16000885)	499 S. Palm Canyon Dr. 33°48′58″N 116°32′48″W	Palm Springs	
22	Community Settlement House	Community Settlement House	December 21, 2017 (#100001906)	4366 Bermuda Ave. 33°58′15″N 117°21′48″W	Riverside	
23	Corn Springs	Corn Springs	October 30, 1998 (#98001286)	Address Restricted	Desert Center	
24	Corona Foothill Ranch		September 23, 2025 (#100012303)	510 West Foothill Parkway; 33°50′43″N 117°34′35″W	Corona	
25	Corona High School	Corona High School	August 3, 2005 (#05000772)	815 W. 6th St. 33°52′35″N 117°34′32″W	Corona	
26	Crescent Bathhouse	Crescent Bathhouse	July 30, 1975 (#75000453)	201 W. Graham Ave. 33°40′09″N 117°19′47″W	Lake Elsinore	
27	Desert Bel Air Showcase House		April 6, 2026 (#100012886)	75900 Fairway Drive; 33°42′52″N 116°20′23″W	Indian Wells	
28	Desert Golf Course	Desert Golf Course	November 23, 2020 (#100005813)	301 North Belardo Rd. 33°49′35″N 116°32′53″W	Palm Springs	
29	Desert Queen Mine	Desert Queen Mine	January 17, 1976 (#76000216)	S of Twentynine Palms in Joshua Tree National Park; 34°01′26″N 116°04′09″W	Twentynine Palms	
30	Donaldson Futuro	Donaldson Futuro	January 4, 2021 (#100005994)	52895 Big Rock Rd. 33°45′19″N 116°44′19″W	Idyllwild	
31	Edris House	Edris House	December 27, 2016 (#16000886)	1030 W. Cielo Dr. 33°50′45″N 116°33′40″W	Palm Springs	
32	Arthur Elrod House	Arthur Elrod House	April 19, 2016 (#16000169)	2175 Southridge Dr. 33°47′36″N 116°30′39″W	Palm Springs	
33	Estudillo Mansion	Estudillo Mansion	October 25, 2001 (#01001178)	150 S. Dillon Avenue; 33°46′51″N 116°58′02″W	San Jacinto	
34	Evergreen Cemetery	Evergreen Cemetery	October 23, 2023 (#100009467)	4414 Fourteenth St. 33°58′48″N 117°23′12″W	Riverside	
35	Federal Post Office	Federal Post Office	November 20, 1978 (#78000737)	3720 Orange St. 33°58′55″N 117°22′18″W	Riverside	
36	Fire Station No. 1	Fire Station No. 1	September 28, 2015 (#15000636)	277 N. Indian Canyon Dr. 33°49′34″N 116°32′45″W	Palm Springs	
37	First Church of Christ, Scientist	First Church of Christ, Scientist	June 14, 2016 (#16000357)	605 S. Riverside Dr. 33°48′37″N 116°32′33″W	Palm Springs	
38	First Church of Christ, Scientist	First Church of Christ, Scientist	September 22, 1992 (#92001250)	3606 Lemon St. 33°58′57″N 117°22′11″W	Riverside	
39	First Congregational Church of Riverside	First Congregational Church of Riverside	April 3, 1997 (#97000297)	3504 Mission Inn Ave. 33°58′54″N 117°22′16″W	Riverside	
40	Frey House II	Frey House II	September 28, 2015 (#15000637)	686 Palisades Dr. 33°49′24″N 116°33′11″W	Palm Springs	
41	Galleano Winery	Galleano Winery	June 22, 2003 (#03000533)	4231 Wineville Rd. 34°00′40″N 117°32′29″W	Mira Loma	
42	Rocco Garbani Homestead		December 22, 1999 (#99001593)	33555 Holland Rd. 33°39′34″N 117°04′24″W	Winchester	
43	Gilman Ranch	Gilman Ranch	November 17, 1977 (#76000508)	1937 W. Gilman St. 33°56′15″N 116°53′54″W	Banning	
44	Grand Boulevard Historic District	Grand Boulevard Historic District	July 14, 2011 (#11000432)	Grand Boulevard; 33°52′09″N 117°34′02″W	Corona	
45	Hamrick House	Hamrick House	September 19, 2016 (#16000635)	875 W. Chino Canyon Rd. 33°50′48″N 116°33′30″W	Palm Springs	
46	Harada House	Harada House	September 15, 1977 (#77000325)	3356 Lemon St. 33°59′06″N 117°22′05″W	Riverside	
47	Heritage House	Heritage House	February 28, 1973 (#73000423)	8193 Magnolia Ave. 33°56′05″N 117°25′20″W	Riverside	
48	Thomas Jefferson Elementary School	Thomas Jefferson Elementary School	September 28, 2017 (#100001663)	1040 S. Vicentia Ave. 33°52′19″N 117°34′33″W	Corona	
49	Cornelius Jensen Ranch	Cornelius Jensen Ranch	September 6, 1979 (#79000519)	4350 Riverview Dr; 33°59′34″N 117°25′01″W	Rubidoux	
50	Kenaston House	Kenaston House	December 27, 2016 (#16000887)	39767 Desert Sun Dr. 33°45′34″N 116°25′05″W	Rancho Mirage	
51	Kocher-Samson Building	Kocher-Samson Building	September 29, 2015 (#15000638)	766 N. Palm Canyon Dr. 33°50′01″N 116°32′48″W	Palm Springs	
52	Koerner House	Koerner House	December 27, 2016 (#16000888)	1275 S. Calle de Maria; 33°48′22″N 116°31′57″W	Palm Springs	
53	Krisel Tract Home, 1882 S. Caliente Road (APN 511032005-9)	Krisel Tract Home, 1882 S. Caliente Road (APN 511032005-9)	December 27, 2019 (#100004813)	1882 South Caliente Drive; 33°47′55″N 116°32′07″W	Palm Springs (Agua Caliente Indian Reservation)	
54	Lake Norconian Club	Lake Norconian Club	February 4, 2000 (#00000033)	Junction of Fifth and Western Ave. 33°55′30″N 117°34′06″W	Norco	
55	Gus Lederer Site		March 12, 2003 (#03000118)	Address Restricted	Desert Center	
56	Loewy House	Loewy House	September 29, 2015 (#15000639)	600 Panorama Rd. 33°50′43″N 116°33′16″W	Palm Springs	
57	Luiseno Ancestral Origin Landscape		October 30, 2014 (#14000851)	Address Restricted	Temecula	
58	March Field Historic District	March Field Historic District	December 6, 1994 (#94001420)	Eschscholtzia Ave., March Air Force Base; 33°53′59″N 117°15′17″W	Riverside	
59	Martinez Canyon Rockhouse	Martinez Canyon Rockhouse	December 14, 1999 (#99001471)	BLM, Palm Springs–South Coast Resource Area; 33°30′20″N 116°19′31″W	North Palm Springs	
60	Martinez Historical District	Martinez Historical District	May 17, 1973 (#73000425)	Off SR 86; 33°33′46″N 116°09′12″W	Torres-Martinez Indian Reservation	
61	Masonic Temple		June 6, 1980 (#80000832)	3650 11th St. 33°58′43″N 117°22′30″W	Riverside	
62	McCoy Spring Archeological Site		May 10, 1982 (#82002226)	Address Restricted	Blythe	
63	Grace Lewis Miller House	Grace Lewis Miller House	March 27, 2020 (#100005158)	2311 North Indian Canyon Dr. 33°51′03″N 116°32′44″W	Palm Springs	
64	Mission Court Bungalows	Mission Court Bungalows	July 8, 1993 (#93000549)	3355–3373 Second St. and 3354–3362 First St. 33°59′12″N 117°21′55″W	Riverside	
65	Mission Inn	Mission Inn	May 14, 1971 (#71000173)	3649 7th St. 33°59′00″N 117°22′18″W	Riverside	
66	Mount San Jacinto State Park Historic District	Mount San Jacinto State Park Historic District	June 25, 2013 (#13000416)	25905 CA 243; 33°45′01″N 116°42′52″W	Idyllwild	
67	Murrieta Creek Archeological Area		April 24, 1973 (#73000424)	Address Restricted	Temecula	
68	North Chuckwalla Mountain Quarry District		August 24, 1981 (#81000165)	Address Restricted	Desert Center	
69	North Chuckwalla Mountains Petroglyph District Ca-Riv 1383		September 3, 1981 (#81000166)	Address Restricted	Desert Center	
70	North Shore Yacht Club	North Shore Yacht Club	September 28, 2015 (#15000640)	99-155 Sea View Dr. 33°31′10″N 115°56′14″W	Mecca	
71	Thomas O'Donnell House	Thomas O'Donnell House	January 7, 2011 (#10001123)	447 Alejo Rd. 33°49′26″N 116°33′03″W	Palm Springs	Address is from when property size was larger. House is west of the Palm Springs Art Museum which is on North Museum Drive.
72	Old YWCA Building	Old YWCA Building	January 28, 1982 (#82002227)	3425 Mission Inn Avenue; 33°58′54″N 117°22′14″W	Riverside	
73	Palm Springs Aerial Tramway Mountain Station	Palm Springs Aerial Tramway Mountain Station	December 27, 2016 (#16000889)	1 Tram Way; 33°48′47″N 116°38′19″W	Idyllwild vicinity	
74	Palm Springs City Hall	Palm Springs City Hall	September 29, 2015 (#15000641)	3200 E. Tahquitz Canyon Way; 33°49′25″N 116°30′42″W	Palm Springs	
75	Palm Springs Desert Museum	Palm Springs Desert Museum	December 27, 2016 (#16000890)	101 Museum Dr. 33°49′27″N 116°33′00″W	Palm Springs	
76	Palm Springs Municipal Airport Terminal	Palm Springs Municipal Airport Terminal	November 24, 2021 (#100006618)	3400 East Tahquitz Canyon Way; 33°49′23″N 116°30′30″W	Palm Springs	
77	Palm Springs Tramway Valley Station	Palm Springs Tramway Valley Station	September 28, 2015 (#15000642)	1 Tram Way; 33°50′15″N 116°36′50″W	Palm Springs	
78	Palm Springs Unified School District Educational Administrative Center	Palm Springs Unified School District Educational Administrative Center	December 27, 2016 (#16000891)	333 S. Farrell Dr. 33°49′08″N 116°31′06″W	Palm Springs	
79	Pearlman Mountain Cabin	Pearlman Mountain Cabin	April 19, 2016 (#16000173)	52820 Middleridge Dr. 33°43′50″N 116°44′27″W	Idyllwild	
80	Perris Depot	Perris Depot	August 5, 1994 (#94000819)	120 W. Fourth St. 33°46′58″N 117°13′46″W	Perris	
81	Plaza Theatre	Plaza Theatre	December 31, 2025 (#100012483)	128 S. Palm Canyon Drive; 33°49′21″N 116°32′47″W	Palm Springs	
82	Riverside Municipal Auditorium and Soldiers' Memorial Building	Riverside Municipal Auditorium and Soldiers' Memorial Building	March 31, 1978 (#78000738)	3485 7th St. 33°58′55″N 117°22′12″W	Riverside	
83	Riverside-Arlington Heights Fruit Exchange	Riverside-Arlington Heights Fruit Exchange	June 9, 1980 (#80000833)	3391 7th St. 33°58′52″N 117°22′10″W	Riverside	7th St. was renamed to Mission Inn Ave. in 1995.
84	Riviera Gardens		June 2, 2021 (#100006608)	290 East Simms Rd., 3100, 3125, 3133, and 3165 North Sunnyview Dr., 300 and, 330 East Molino Rd. 33°51′30″N 116°32′39″W	Palm Springs	
85	Ryan House and Lost Horse Well	Ryan House and Lost Horse Well	June 5, 1975 (#75000175)	S of Twentynine Palms in Joshua Tree National Park; 33°59′06″N 116°08′52″W	Twentynine Palms	
86	San Pedro, Los Angeles, & Salt Lake RR Depot	San Pedro, Los Angeles, & Salt Lake RR Depot	April 18, 1977 (#77000326)	3751 Vine St. 33°58′45″N 117°21′59″W	Riverside	
87	San Timoteo Canyon Schoolhouse	San Timoteo Canyon Schoolhouse	January 19, 2001 (#00001646)	31985 San Timoteo Canyon Rd. 33°58′33″N 117°06′10″W	Redlands	
88	Sandcliff	Sandcliff	April 1, 2025 (#100011596)	1800-1876 S. Barona Road and 1805-1859 Sandcliff Road; 33°47′57″N 116°31′09″W	Palm Springs	
89	Santa Fe Federal Savings and Loan Association	Santa Fe Federal Savings and Loan Association	December 27, 2016 (#16000892)	300 S. Palm Canyon Dr. 33°49′09″N 116°32′48″W	Palm Springs	
90	Sieroty House	Sieroty House	September 28, 2015 (#15000643)	695 E. Vereda Sur; 33°50′19″N 116°32′22″W	Palm Springs	
91	M. H. Simon's Undertaking Chapel	M. H. Simon's Undertaking Chapel	June 9, 1980 (#80000834)	3610 11th St. 33°58′43″N 117°22′29″W	Riverside	
92	Maurice Smith and Dinah Shore House	Maurice Smith and Dinah Shore House	September 23, 2019 (#100004405)	432 Hermosa Place; 33°50′09″N 116°33′07″W	Palm Springs	
93	Frank Sinatra House	Frank Sinatra House	December 27, 2016 (#16000893)	1145 E. Via Colusa Rd. 33°49′52″N 116°32′01″W	Palm Springs	
94	Southern Hotel	Southern Hotel	October 15, 1992 (#92001384)	445 S. D St. 33°46′54″N 117°13′42″W	Perris	
95	Sutherland Fruit Company	Sutherland Fruit Company	April 11, 1986 (#86000732)	3191 Seventh St. 33°58′50″N 117°21′59″W	Riverside	
96	Tahquitz Canyon	Tahquitz Canyon	October 31, 1972 (#72000246)	500 West Mesquite; 33°48′31″N 116°33′02″W	Palm Springs	
97	Tramway Gas Station	Tramway Gas Station	September 28, 2015 (#15000645)	2901 N. Palm Canyon Dr. 33°51′30″N 116°33′29″W	Palm Springs	Now the Palm Springs Visitor Center
98	Trujillo Adobe		July 7, 2025 (#100011987)	3669 W. Center Street; 34°01′08″N 117°21′00″W	Riverside	
99	University Heights Junior High School	University Heights Junior High School	June 24, 1993 (#93000547)	2060 University Ave. 33°58′30″N 117°21′20″W	Riverside	
100	Victoria Avenue	Victoria Avenue	October 26, 2000 (#00001267)	Victoria Ave., from Arlington Ave. to Boundary Ln. 33°55′33″N 117°23′57″W	Riverside	
101	Wexler House	Wexler House	September 23, 2019 (#100004404)	1272 E. Verbena Dr. 33°50′05″N 116°31′54″W	Palm Springs	
102	E. Stewart and Mari Williams House		December 27, 2016 (#16000894)	Address restricted	Palm Springs	
103	Wolf Store and Vail Ranch Headquarters	Wolf Store and Vail Ranch Headquarters	June 1, 2023 (#100009030)	32115 Temecula Pkwy. 33°28′45″N 117°05′54″W	Temecula	
104	Woman's Improvement Club Clubhouse	Woman's Improvement Club Clubhouse	November 3, 1988 (#88002014)	1101 S. Main St. 33°52′12″N 117°33′58″W	Corona	

== Former listings ==
	Name on the Register	Image	Date listed	Date removed	Location	City or town	Description
1	Steel Development House Number 2	Steel Development House Number 2	March 20, 2012 (#12000125)	June 2, 2021	3125 N. Sunny View Dr. 33°51′30″N 116°32′39″W	Palm Springs	

== See also ==
- List of National Historic Landmarks in California
- National Register of Historic Places listings in California
- California Historical Landmarks in Riverside County, California
