= Movie Colony East =

Neighborhood in Palm Springs, CA

- Neighborhoods of Palm Springs, California
- The Movie Colony East logo or blade.
- Interactive map of Movie Colony East
- Country: United States
- State: California
- County: Riverside County
- City: Palm Springs
- City Council Districts: 3

Government
  - Council Member: Ron deHarte
  - State Assembly: Greg Wallis, Rep.
  - State Senate: Rosilicie Ochoa Bogh, Rep.
  - US Representatives: Ken Calvert, Rep.
  - US Senate: Alex Padilla, Dem. Adam B. Schiff, Dem.

Movie Colony East is one of the recognized neighborhoods in Palm Springs, California. Its boundaries are Alejo Road to the south, Vista Chino to the north, Sunrise Way to the east, and Avenida Caballeros to the west.

The area became associated with members of the Hollywood film industry who owned and rented homes there, contributing to Palm Springs’ reputation as a desert retreat for the entertainment community. The neighborhood contains residences designed in both Spanish Colonial Revival and mid-century modern architecture. The district is distinct from The Movie Colony neighborhood which is adjacent, to the west.

Movie Colony East is one of the 52 legally recognized neighborhoods in Palm Springs by the City of Palm Springs Office of Neighborhoods and is part of the Organized Neighborhoods of Palm Springs (ONE-PS).

== History ==
Residential development in the area now known as Movie Colony East began in the late 1930s, expanding east from the earlier Movie Colony neighborhood as Palm Springs entered a period of growth before and after World War II. The neighborhood’s proximity to the El Mirador Hotel and Ruth Hardy Park contributed to its early association with visitors from the Hollywood film industry, while its tract housing reflected emerging modernist architectural trends.

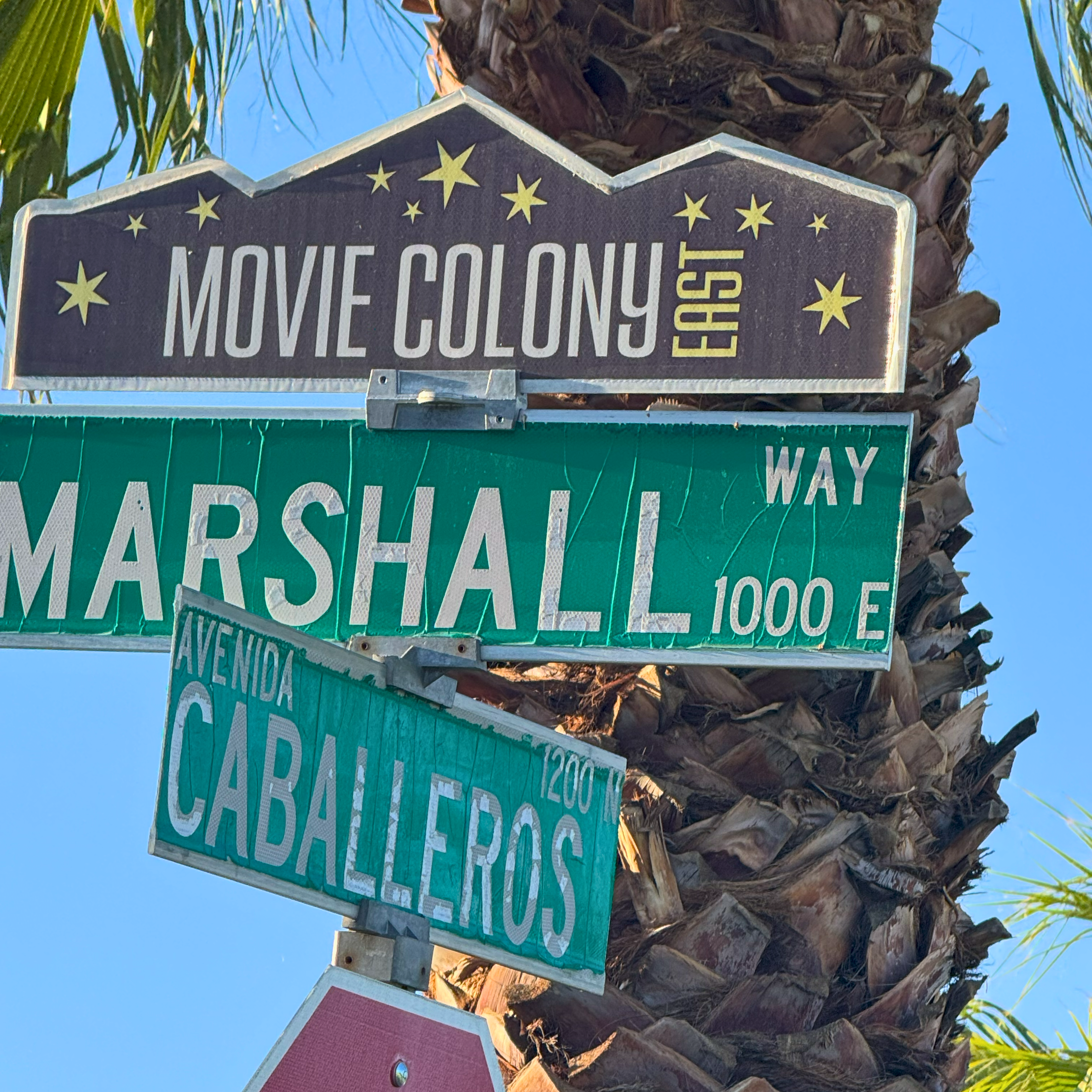
Movie Colony East Blade

In May 2012, residents of the area voted to change its name from “Ruth Hardy Park” to “Movie Colony East” to clarify its distinction from the park itself, which is part of the adjacent Movie Colony neighborhood. The Palm Springs City Council formally approved the change the following month.

Today, Movie Colony East contains several residences that have been designated as Class 1 Historic Sites by the City of Palm Springs and properties listed on the National Register of Historic Places.

The Movie Colony East Neighborhood Organization (MCENO) is the legal entity that represents the neighborhood as part of ONE-PS.

== Architecture ==
Movie Colony East features a mix of architectural styles that reflect the evolution of Palm Springs’ residential development from the 1930s through the postwar period. Early houses were typically built in the Spanish Colonial Revival style, characterized by stucco exteriors, clay tile roofs, and enclosed courtyards.

By the mid-20th century, construction increasingly reflected principles of mid-century modern design. These homes often used post-and-beam structural systems, clerestory windows, deep overhangs, and open floor plans.

Architects associated with residences in the neighborhood include E. Stewart Williams, Donald Wexler, and Albert Frey. Frey’s Bel Vista tract, in particular, was among the earliest examples of federally funded modernist housing in Palm Springs.

== Historic properties ==
Seven homes located in Movie Colony East neighborhood have been designated Class 1 Historic Sites by the City of Palm Springs, and three are listed on the National Register of Historic Places.

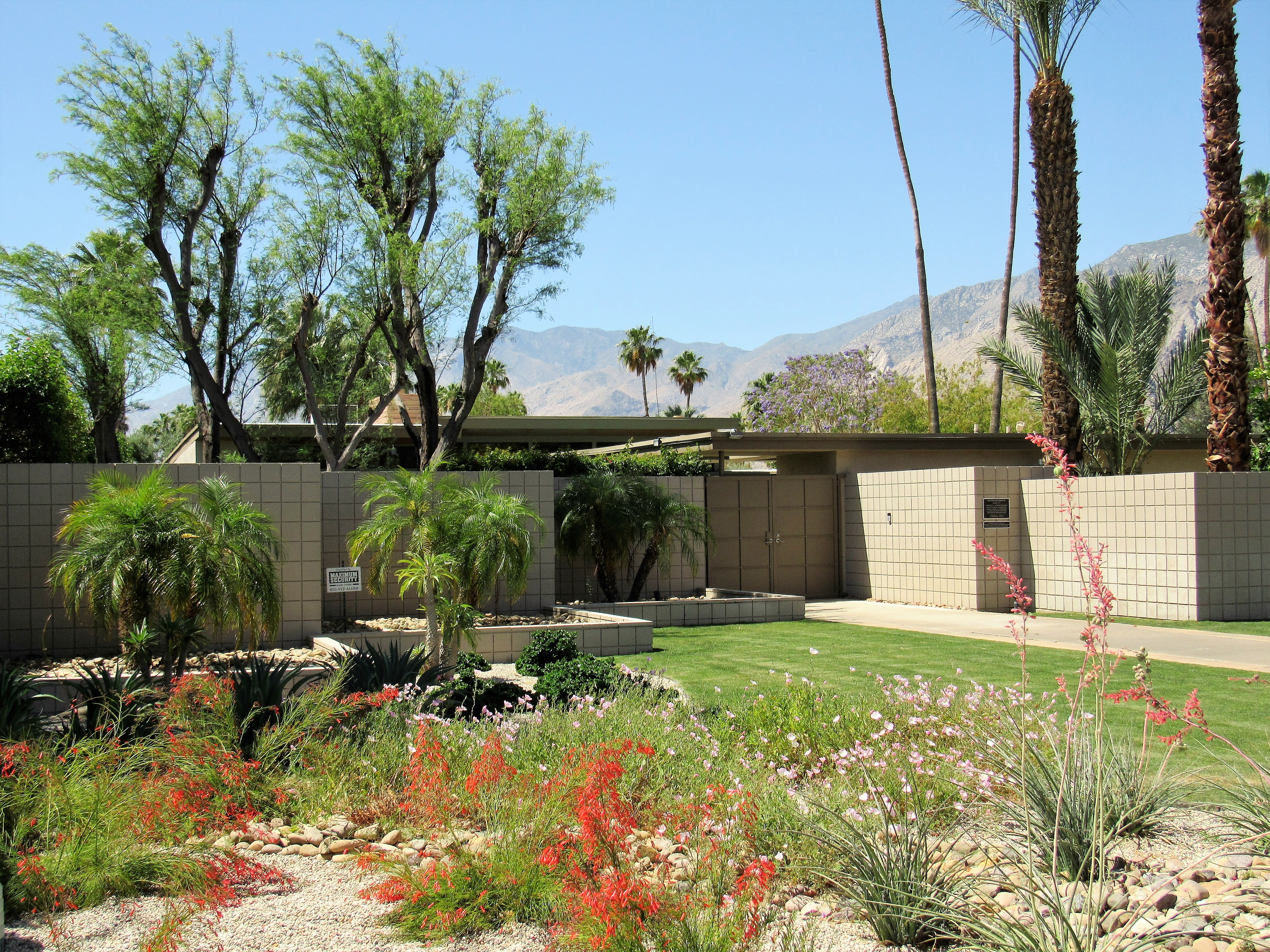
Frank Sinatra's Twin Palms

=== Frank Sinatra's Twin Palms ===
In 1947, Frank Sinatra commissioned architect E. Stewart Williams to design his home, known as Twin Palms, located at 1145 East Via Colusa. The property is regarded as an early example of mid-century modern architecture in Palm Springs. The design features post-and-beam construction, extensive use of glass, and a piano-shaped swimming pool. The property was designated a Class 1 Historic Site by the City of Palm Springs in 2011, and was added to the National Register of Historic Places in 2016.

=== Wexler Residence ===
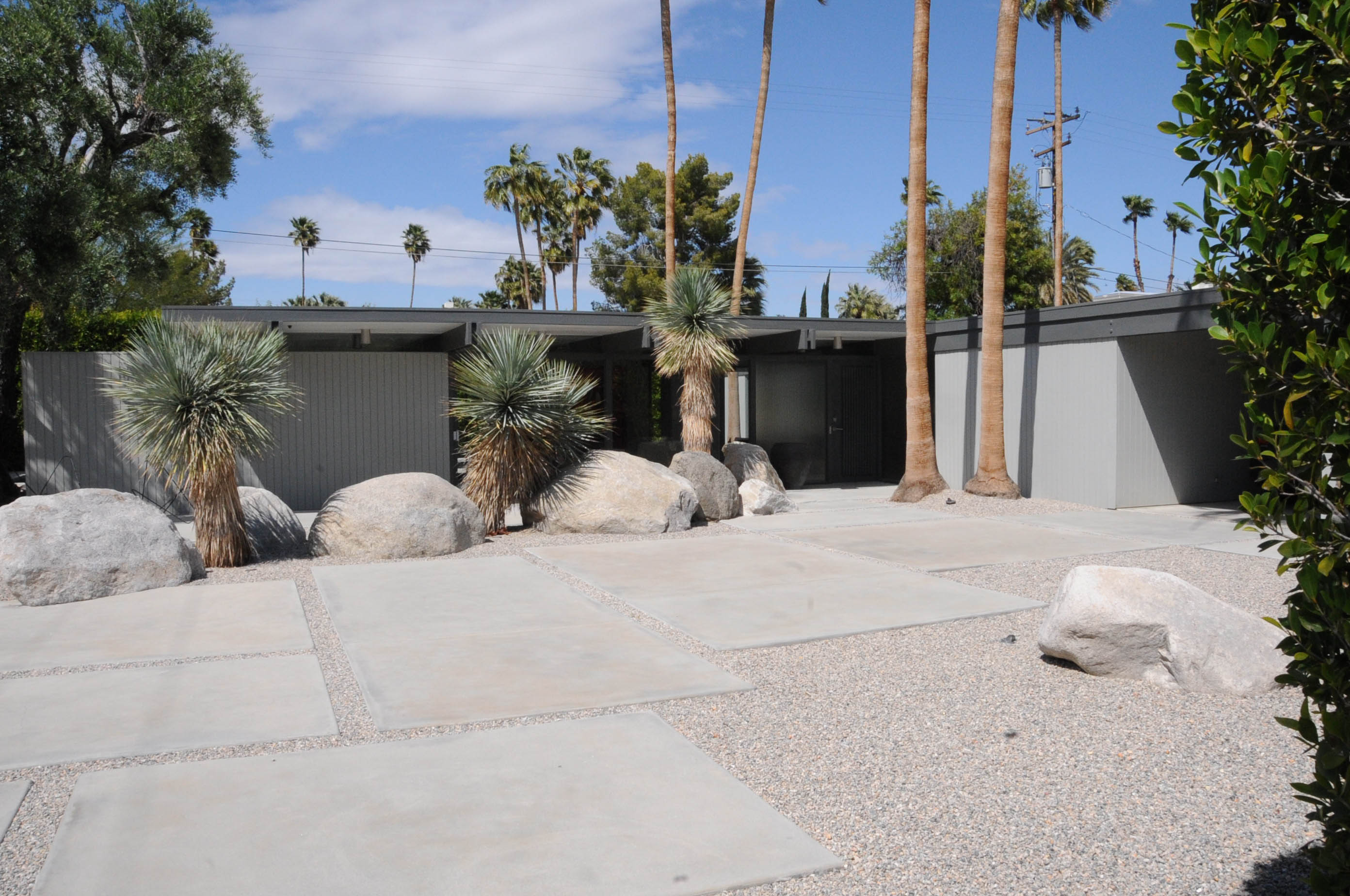
Wexler Residence

The Donald and Marilynn Wexler Residence, located at 1272 Verbena Drive, was designed in 1955 by architect Donald Wexler as his personal residence. The single-story house exemplifies post-and-beam construction with flat rooflines, deep overhangs, and extensive glazing to maximize views of the San Jacinto Mountains. Its open floor plan and use of experimental materials reflected Wexler’s broader interest in adapting modernist design to the desert climate. The residence has remained largely unaltered since its construction and is recognized as one of the most intact examples of Wexler’s residential work. It was designated a Class 1 Historic Site by the City of Palm Springs in 2021 and is also listed on the National Register of Historic Places.

=== E. Stewart and Mari Williams Residence ===
The E. Stewart and Mari Williams Residence, located at 1314 Culver Place, was designed in 1955 by architect E. Stewart Williams as his personal home with his wife, Mari. The mid-century modern design incorporates post-and-beam construction, a flat roof, broad overhangs, and walls of glass to open the interiors to the surrounding desert landscape. In 2016, it was listed on the National Register of Historic Places.

=== General Houses, Inc. Model Home ===
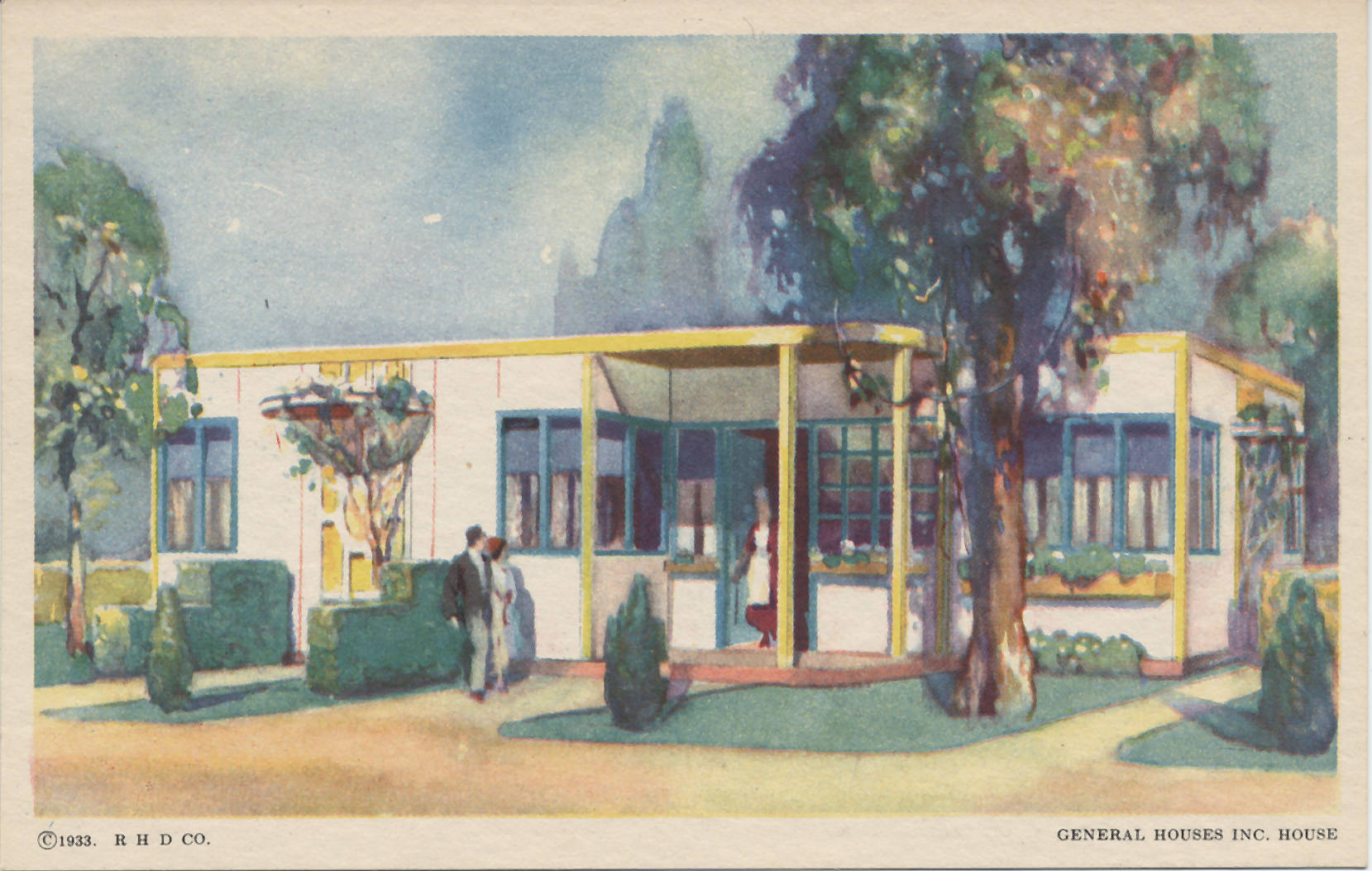
Artist rendering of the General Houses Model Home

The General Houses, Inc. Model Home, located at 1320 East Tamarisk Road, was constructed in 1935 as a prefabricated steel house by the Chicago-based General Houses, Inc. Designed as part of a nationwide experiment in affordable, mass-produced housing, the structure features steel wall panels, a flat roof, and modular construction methods. This property remains one of the few surviving examples of General Houses' work in the United States. It was designated a Class 1 Historic Site by the City of Palm Springs.

=== Bel Vista Residence #1 ===
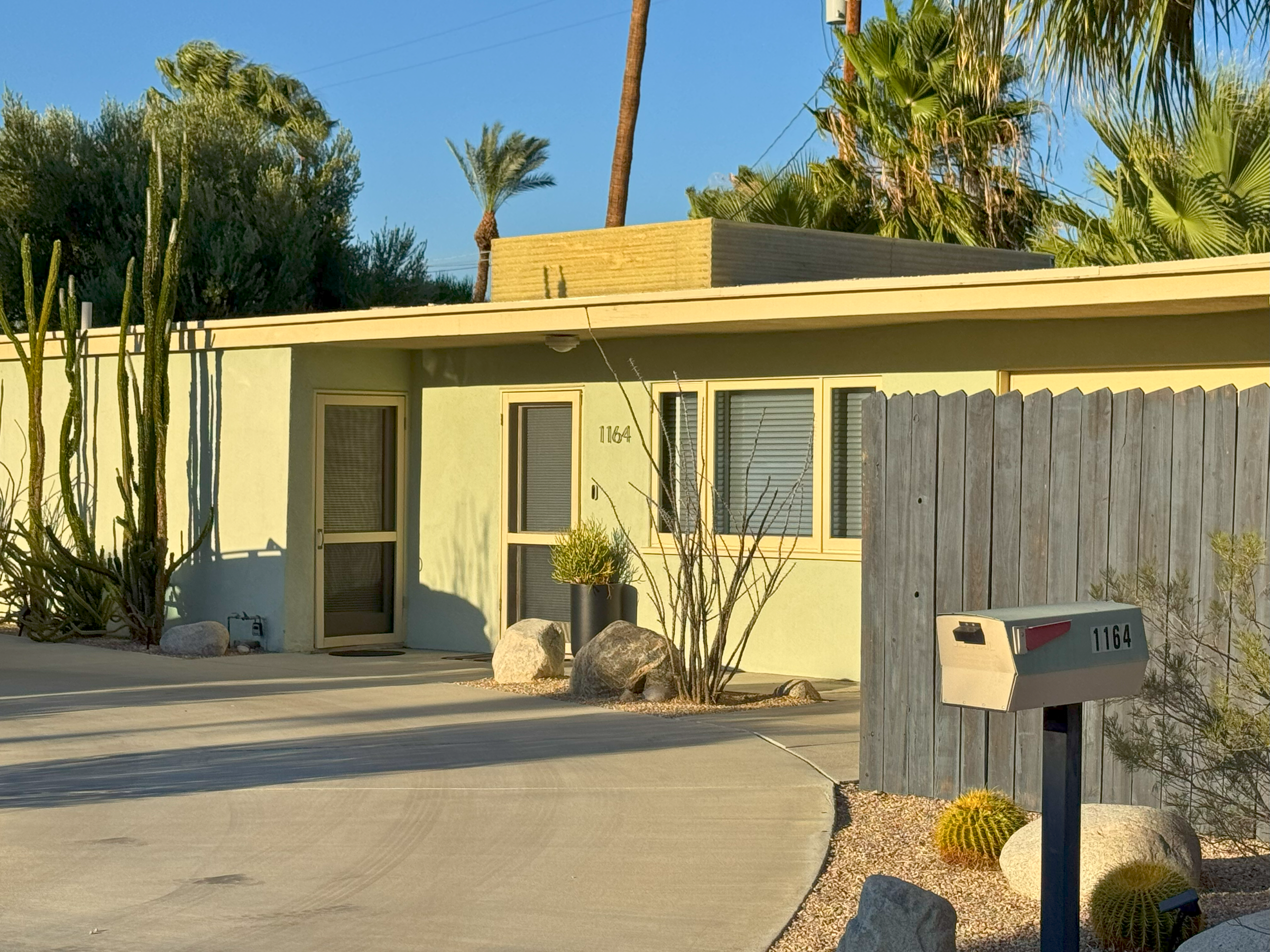
Bel Vista Residence #1

Bel Vista Residence #1, located at 1164 North Calle Rolph, was designed in 1946 by architect Albert Frey as part of the Bel Vista tract, an early postwar residential development in Palm Springs. The single-story residence features a simple rectangular plan, flat roof, overhanging eaves, and large expanses of glass. The home was designated a Class 1 Historic Site by the City of Palm Springs.

=== Bel Vista Residence #2 ===
Similar to Bel Vista Residence #1, Bel Vista Residence #2, located at 1520 East Tachevah Drive, was constructed in 1946 as part of the Bel Vista tract. Like other Bel Vista homes, it employed modest materials such as concrete block and wood framing, combined with modernist aesthetics. It was designated a Class 1 Historic Site by the City of Palm Springs. The property was also added to the National Register of Historic Places in 2020.

=== Albert Frey Bel Vista #3 ===
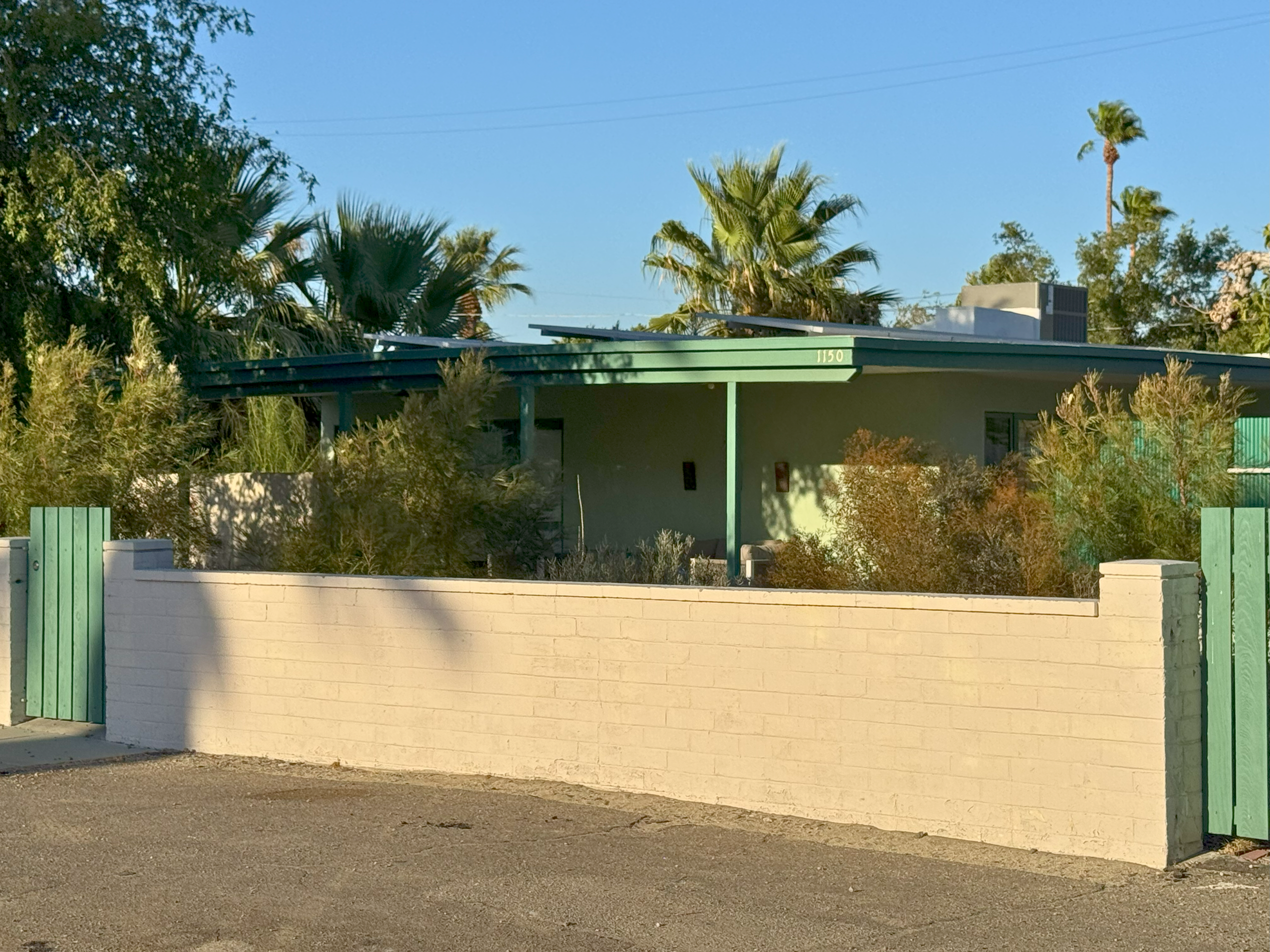
Albert Frey Bel Vista #3

The Albert Frey Bel Vista #3 residence, located at 1150 North Calle Rolph, was also part of the Bel Vista tract. As with Bel Visa Residence #1 and #2, this home reflects the modernist principles Frey brought to small-scale residential design. It was designated a Class 1 Historic Site by the City of Palm Springs in 2016. It is also listed on the National Register of Historic Places.

=== Harriet Van Horn Residence ===
The Harriet Van Horn Residence, located at 1121 Linda Vista Road, was designed in 1960 by architect Hugh M. Kaptur for New York Post journalist and interior designer Harriet Van Horn. The single-story home exhibits key elements of mid-century modern architecture, including a low-pitched roof, wide overhangs, clerestory windows, and an open floor plan designed for desert living. The property retains its original design integrity and was designated a Class 1 Historic Site by the City of Palm Springs in 2020.

== Notable residents ==
Individuals who have owned or resided in Movie Colony East include:

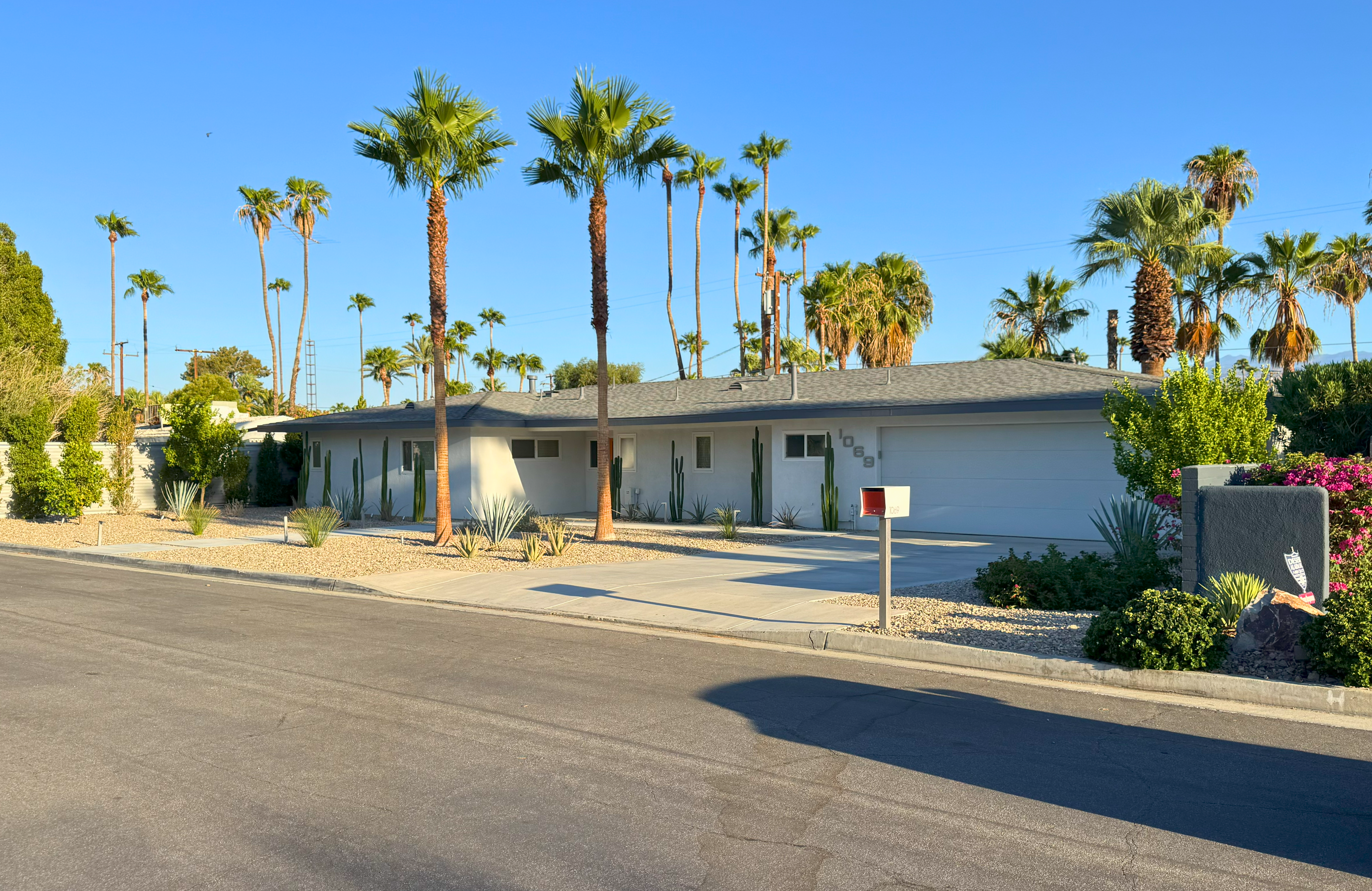
Kirk Douglas' home at 1069 East Marshall Way

- Bing Crosby, singer and actor.
- Kirk Douglas, actor.
- Albert Frey, architect.
- Bob Hope and Delores Hope, entertainers and philanthropists.
- Howard Hughes, entrepreneur.
- Hedy Lamarr, actress and inventor.
- Carmen Miranda, entertainer.
- Frank Sinatra, singer and actor.
- Keely Smith, jazz singer.
- Donald Wexler, architect.
- E. Stewart and Mari Williams, architect.
