= The Movie Colony =

Neighborhood in Palm Springs, CA

- Neighborhoods of Palm Springs, California
- The Movie Colony Neighborhood Organization Logo
- Interactive map of The Movie Colony
- Coordinates: 33°50′04″N 116°32′31″W
- Country: United States
- State: California
- County: Riverside County
- City: Palm Springs
- City Council Districts: 3

Government
  - Council Member: Ron deHarte
  - State Assembly: Greg Wallis, Rep.
  - State Senate: Rosilicie Ochoa Bogh, Rep.
  - US Representatives: Ken Calvert, Rep.
  - US Senate: Alex Padilla, Dem. Adam B. Schiff, Dem.

The Movie Colony (also known as "Old Movie Colony") is one of the recognized neighborhoods in Palm Springs, California, developed primarily during the 1930s and 1940s. The community includes 170 homes, bound by Tachevah Road on the North, Alejo Road on the South, Avenida Caballeros on the East and Indian Canyon on the West.

The area became associated with members of the Hollywood film industry who owned and rented homes there, contributing to Palm Springs’ reputation as a desert retreat for the entertainment community. The neighborhood contains residences designed in both Spanish Colonial Revival and mid-century modern architecture. The district is distinct from the adjacent Movie Colony East neighborhood.

The Movie Colony is one of the 52 legally recognized neighborhoods in Palm Springs by the City of Palm Springs Office of Neighborhoods and is part of the Organized Neighborhoods of Palm Springs (ONE-PS).

== History ==
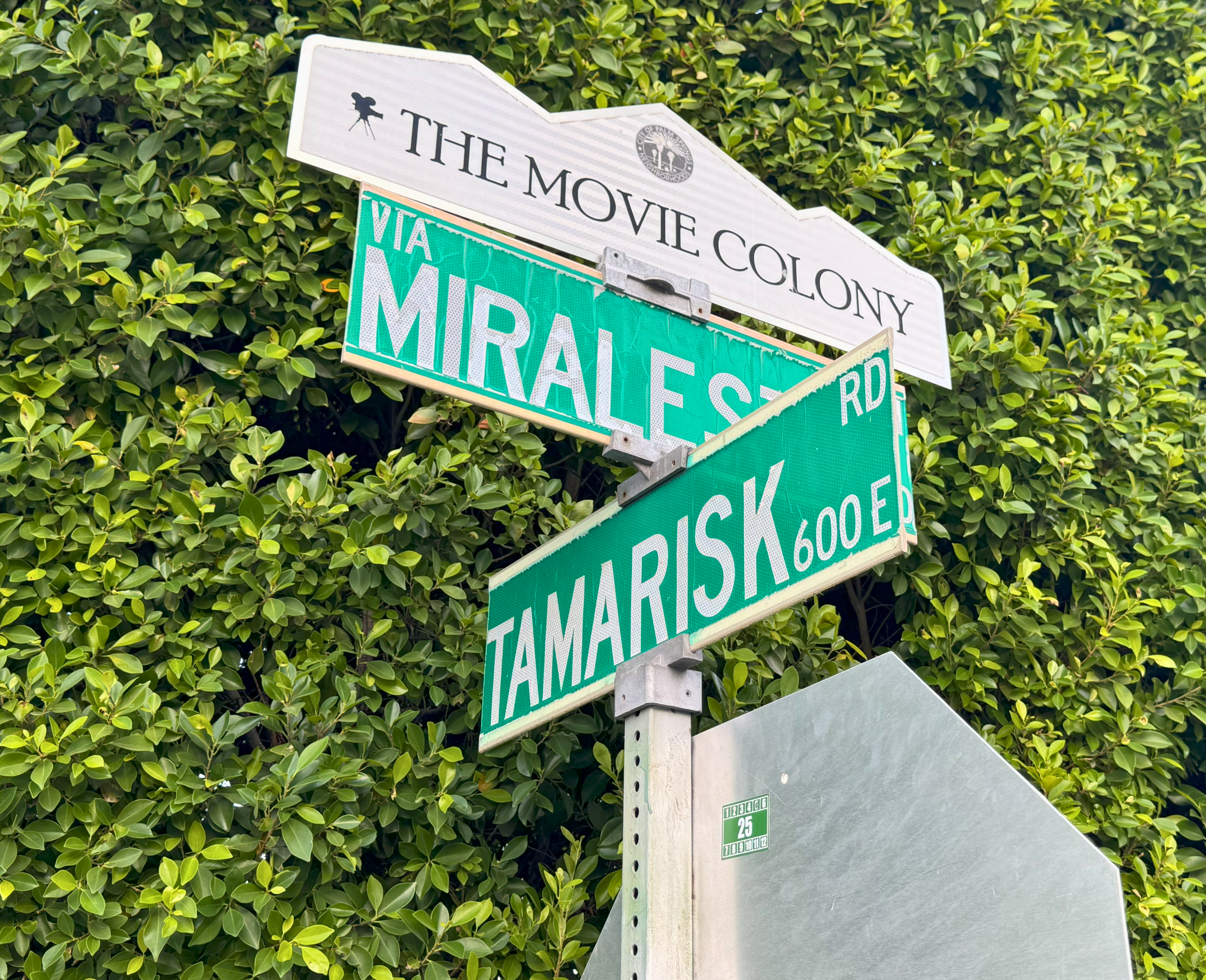
The neighborhood name appears above street signs in The Movie Colony as part of the city's "Blade" sign program.

The Movie Colony developed in proximity to the El Mirador Hotel, which opened in 1928 and was a destination for visitors from the entertainment industry. During the 1930s, entertainers and studio executives purchased properties in the neighborhood. The neighborhood got its name because of the Hollywood celebrities who resided there. Celebrity residents included Cary Grant, Jack Benny, and Dinah Shore.

The Movie Colony Neighborhood Organization (MCNO) is the legal entity that represents the neighborhood as part of ONE-PS, and advocates for the neighborhood's preservation.

== Architecture ==
The neighborhood contains examples of Spanish Colonial Revival houses, many built in the 1920s and 1930s, characterized by stucco walls, clay tile roofs, and enclosed courtyards.

Later development introduced mid-century modern residences designed by architects such as Albert Frey, William Cody, and E. Stewart Williams. Frey's 1935 Movie Colony Hotel is located within the neighborhood and has been described as one of Palm Springs’ early modernist landmarks.

== Historic properties ==
There are several homes located in The Movie Colony that have been designated Class 1 Historic Sites by the City of Palm Springs.

=== Rachel de Brabant Residence ===
The Rachel de Brabant Residence is located at 982 North Avenida Palmas. Built in the 1920s, it is an early example of Spanish Colonial Revival design. In 2010, the City of Palm Springs designated the property as a Class 1 Historic Site.

=== Cary Grant House ===
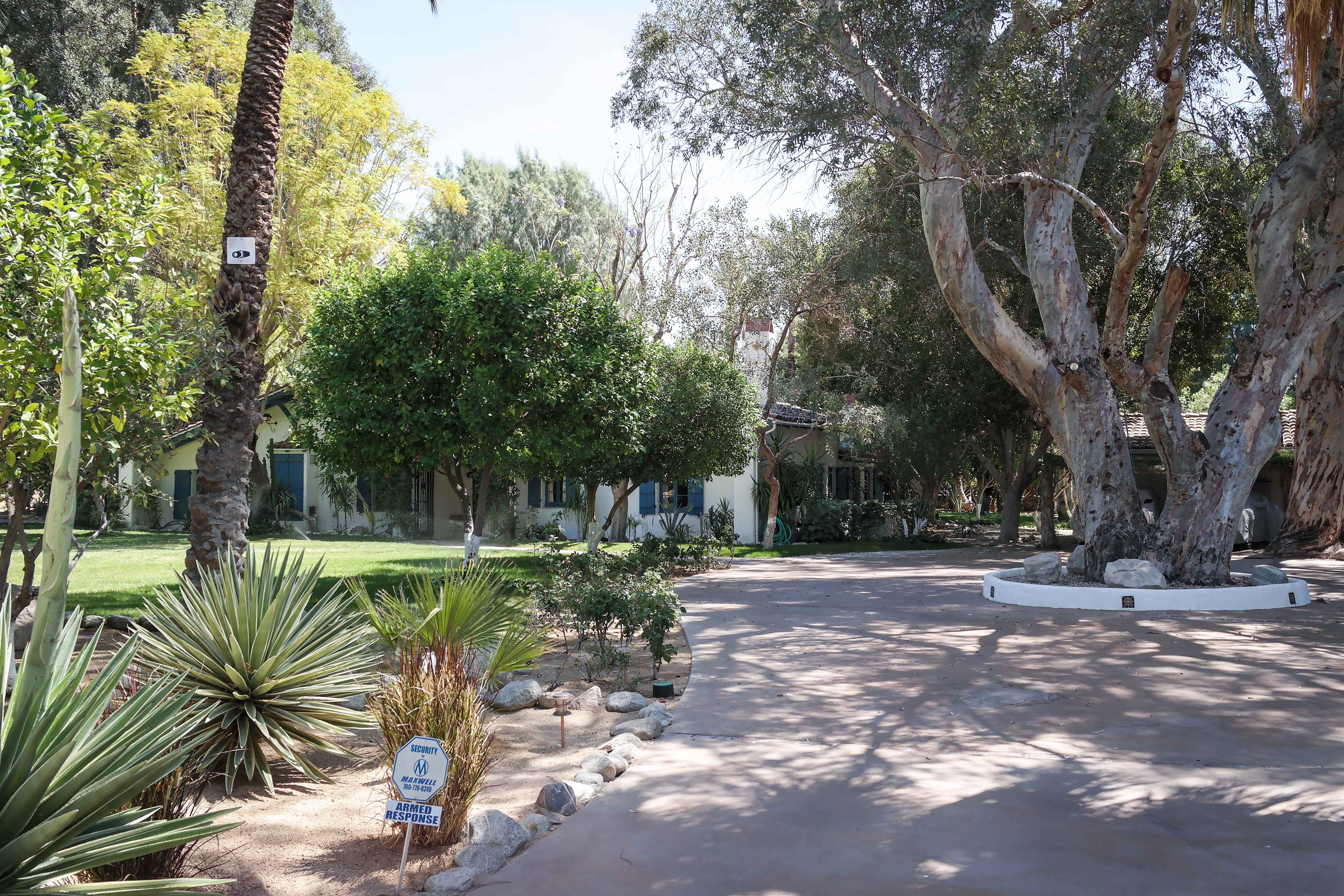
Cary Grant's house

Cary Grant House (also known as Las Palomas) is a Spanish Colonial Revival residence located at 928 North Avenida Palmas. The home was commissioned in 1927 for Dr. Jacob John Kocher, a pharmacist. The property sits on approximately 1.5 acres and incorporates typical features of the style, including stucco exteriors, a red tile roof, and landscaped courtyards. Cary Grant and his wife, actor Betsy Drake, owned the home from 1954 to 1972. In 2011, the City of Palm Springs designated the property as a Class 1 Historic Site.

=== Kramer Residence ===
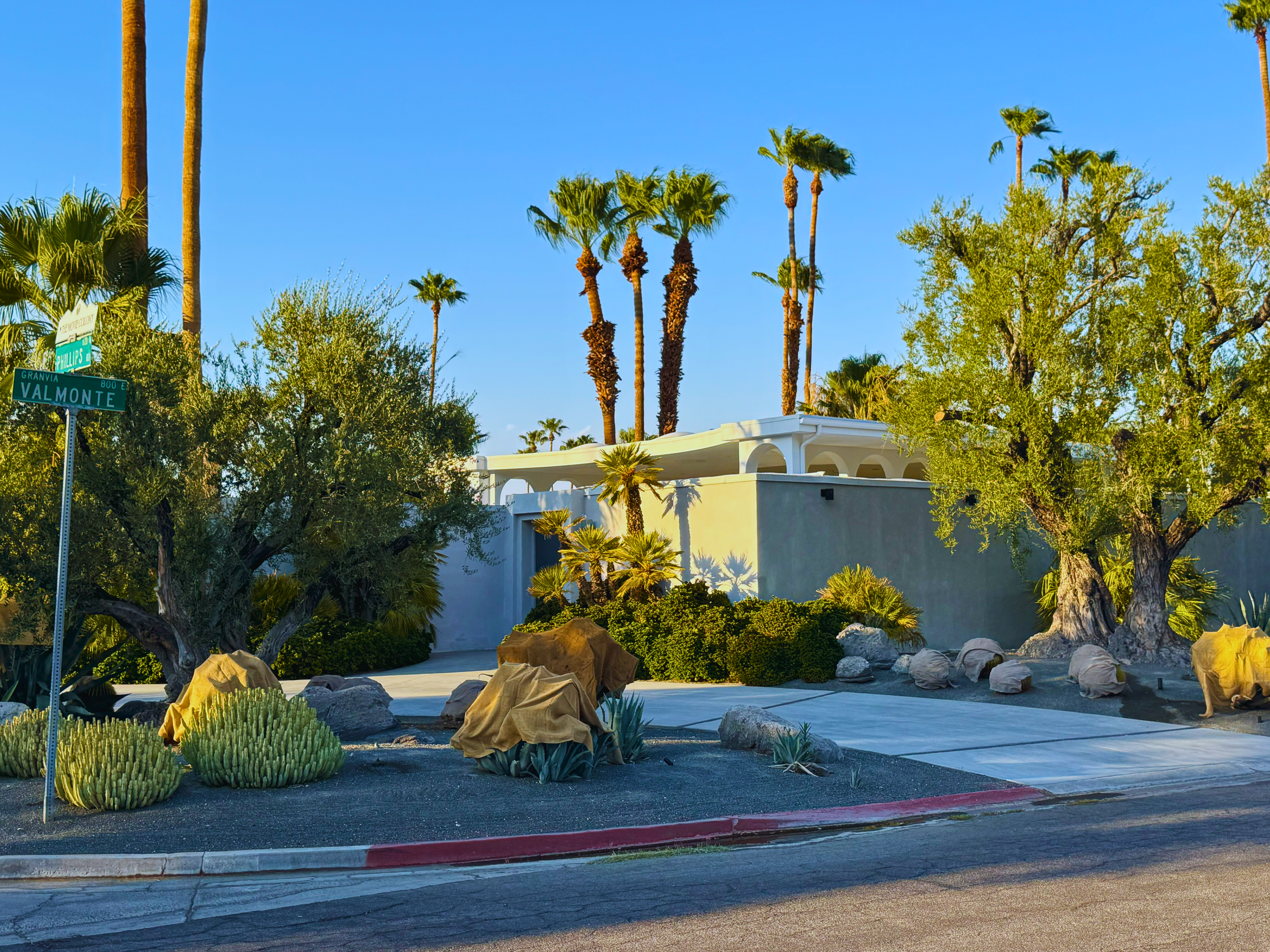
The Kramer Residence

The Kramer Residence, located at 800 East Granvia Valmonte, was commissioned by Allan and Mildred Kramer, completed in 1963. According to the Palm Springs Preservation Foundation, the house was designed by architect James McNaughton and exhibits characteristics of New Formalism architecture, including a symmetrical plan, vertical emphasis, and formal expression uncommon in residential design. The home received attention in Architectural Digest in 2017 when it was featured as the venue for the DeÇaSo design dinner, described as a “modernist Kramer House.” In 2019, the City of Palm Springs designated the property a Class 1 Historic Site.

=== James Logan Abernathy Residence ===
The James Logan Abernathy Residence is located at 611 North Phillips Road, and was built in 1962 for businessman James Logan Abernathy. Designed by architect William Cody, the home is arranged in a series of pavilions connected by pergolas and features post-and-beam construction, deep roof overhangs, and floor-to-ceiling glass walls. The design reflects mid-20th-century modernist principles, including open plans and integration of indoor and outdoor spaces. In 2013, the City of Palm Springs designated the home a Class 1 Historic Site. In 2024, The Wall Street Journal reported on the restoration and sale of the residence, noting its status as a designated historic landmark.

==== Additional Class 1 Historic Sites, The Movie Colony ====
Additionally, five other properties have been designated Class 1 Historic Sites by the City of Palm Springs:

| The David Margolius Residence / Ambassador Hotel / Spanish Inn | 640 North Indian Canyon Drive |
| Invernada Residence (George Heigho) | 657 North Via Miraleste |
| William Schwartz Residence | 200 East Tamarisk Road |
| Steven Cushman Residence | 840 North Indian Canyon |
| Frank Conklin Residence / Palm Springs Club | 265 East Via Altamira |

== Notable residents ==
Individuals who owned or resided in Movie Colony include:

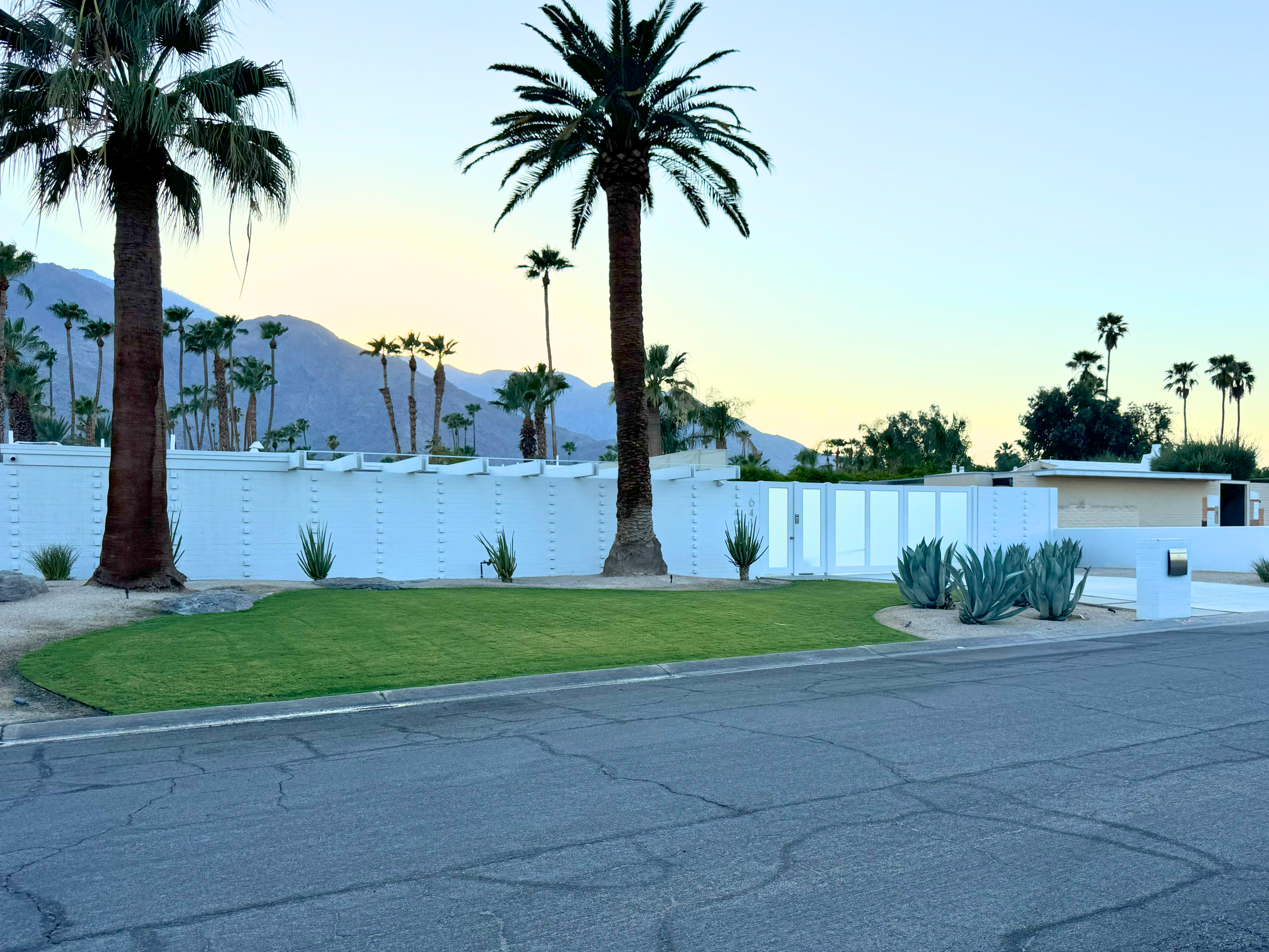
641 N Camino Real. Former home of Tony Curtis and Janet Leigh

- James Logan Abernathy, businessman.
- Jack Benny, comedian.
- Tony Curtis and Janet Leigh, actors.
- Rachel de Brabant, socialite.
- Cary Grant and Betsy Drake, actors.
- Harry Hanbury, politician.
- Marion Huntington, socialite.
- Barbara Hutton, philanthropist and socialite (with husband Cary Grant).
- Al Jolson, entertainer.
- Allan and Mildred Kramer, businessman.
- Tillie Lewis, businesswoman.
- Harold Lloyd, actor and comedian.
- Steve McQueen and Ali MacGraw, actors.
- Marilyn Monroe, actress and Joe DiMaggio, baseball player.
- Edwin H. Morris, music publisher.
- George Almer Newhall Jr., businessman.
- Phil Regan, actor.
- David O. Selznick, producer. 796 Via Miraleste
- Dinah Shore, singer and TV host, and George Montgomery, actor.
- Gloria Swanson, actor.
- Darryl Zanuck, producer.

== See also ==
- Movie Colony Neighborhood Organization
- Organized Neighborhoods of Palm Springs
- Palm Springs Office of Neighborhoods
