= Paul Grimm =

Paul Grimm may refer to:

- Paul A. Grimm (1892–1974), artist
- Paul Grimm (prehistorian) (1907–1993), German prehistorian and medieval archaeologist
- Paul W. Grimm (born 1951), United States District Judge
