= Leon Joseph Koerner =

Canadian businessman (1892–1972)

Leon Joseph Koerner (May 24, 1892 – September 26, 1972) was a Czech-born Canadian industrialist and philanthropist in British Columbia.

He was born in Nový Hrozenkov in what is now the Czech Republic and was educated at the Export Academy in Vienna, the London School of Economics and the Sorbonne. After serving in World War I, he joined the family lumber company, becoming head of the company in 1920. In 1922, he married Thea Rosenquist. With the rise of Nazi Germany, Koerner's family abandoned their possessions and business interests; he escaped to London, England and then travelled with his wife to North America. In Vancouver, his wife came down with a severe case of the mumps.

While his wife was recovering, Koerner acquired a defunct lumber mill in New Westminster. Founding a timber company with his brothers Theodor, Otto, and Walter, he was able to market western hemlock successfully as "Alaska pine". The company introduced innovative and progressive practices to the British Columbia forest industry such as selective logging, reforestation, improvements in workplace safety and better wages and benefits. Koerner became a Canadian citizen in 1947. In 1955, he and his wife created a foundation, the Leon and Thea Koerner Foundation, which contributed to education, the creative arts and social programs, particularly in British Columbia.

The Koerner House, Leon and Thea Koerner's residence in Palm Springs, California, was designed by master architect E. Stewart Williams in 1955.

Thea Koerner died in 1959. Leon suffered a stroke in 1966. In May 1972, he suffered a broken hip after a fall and he died later that year at the age of 80 in his penthouse atop the Thea Koerner House Graduate Student Centre of the University of British Columbia.

Koerner was inducted into the Canadian Business Hall of Fame in 1983.
