= Frey House II =

Residence in Palm Springs, California, US

Frey House II is a modernist house in Palm Springs, California United States designed by noted architect Albert Frey and completed in 1964. The house was also his personal home, the second in Palm Springs. The house incorporates many elements of the International Style such as and open floorplan and thought to the structure's relationship with the landscape. The New York Times said the house "encapsulated the man in [its] spare elegance perfectly attuned to the landscape."

== Location ==
It is located at 686 West Palisades Drive, part way up San Jacinto Mountain.

== History ==
Frey's first home in Palm Springs, Frey House I, was built in 1940. In 1964, he sold it to a developer who demolished the house and built a multi-unit development that went bankrupt. Frey House II was built in 1964. At the time, the home was at the highest elevation of any home in Palm Springs. Frey spent five years selecting the site and one year to measure the movement of the sun at the site.

Frey bequeathed the home to the Palm Springs Art Museum upon his death in 1998.

== Architecture and fittings ==
The Palm Springs local government called the design "crazy" but gave approval.

It is 800 square feet (74 m^{2}). The base is a concrete block and it has a steel structure with large glass floor to ceiling windows. It incorporates a large boulder into the design, which acts as a divider between the main bedroom and living room, the glass exterior was cut to enclose the boulder. There is a lower terrace with a pool and Frey used a sliding glass curtain between the pool and living room. The living room has built in furniture, and a yellow curtain that Frey chose because of the wildflowers on the site, such as brittlebrush flowers. The roof is made of terra cotta colored corrugated metal.

The house is on an east-west orientation, which allows for passive solar heat and cooling.

A guest bedroom of 300 square feet (28 m^{2}) was added in 1967.

== Heritage listing ==
It was listed on the National Register of Historic Places on September 28, 2015.

It is available occasionally for tours.
