= Edris House =

Historic house in California, United States

- U.S. National Register of Historic Places
- Location within California Location within the United States
- Location: 1030 W. Cielo Dr. Palm Springs, California
- Coordinates: 33°50′46″N 116°33′41″W
- Area: less than one acre
- Built: 1954
- Architect: E. Stewart Williams
- Architectural style: Modern Movement
- MPS: Architecture of E. Stewart Williams MPS
- NRHP reference No.: 16000886
- Added to NRHP: December 27, 2016

The Edris House is a mid-century modern house designed by E. Stewart Williams in Palm Springs, California for William and Majorie Edris in 1954. The house is situated on a rocky outcrop, with the exterior of the house clad in wood. Edris was the owner of the Fairmont Olympic Hotel in Seattle, Washington.

The house was later owned by J. R. Roberts, former managing director of the Palm Springs Art Museum and Design Center.

The house was listed on the National Register of Historic Places in 2016.
