= Kenaston House =

Historic house in California, United States

- U.S. National Register of Historic Places
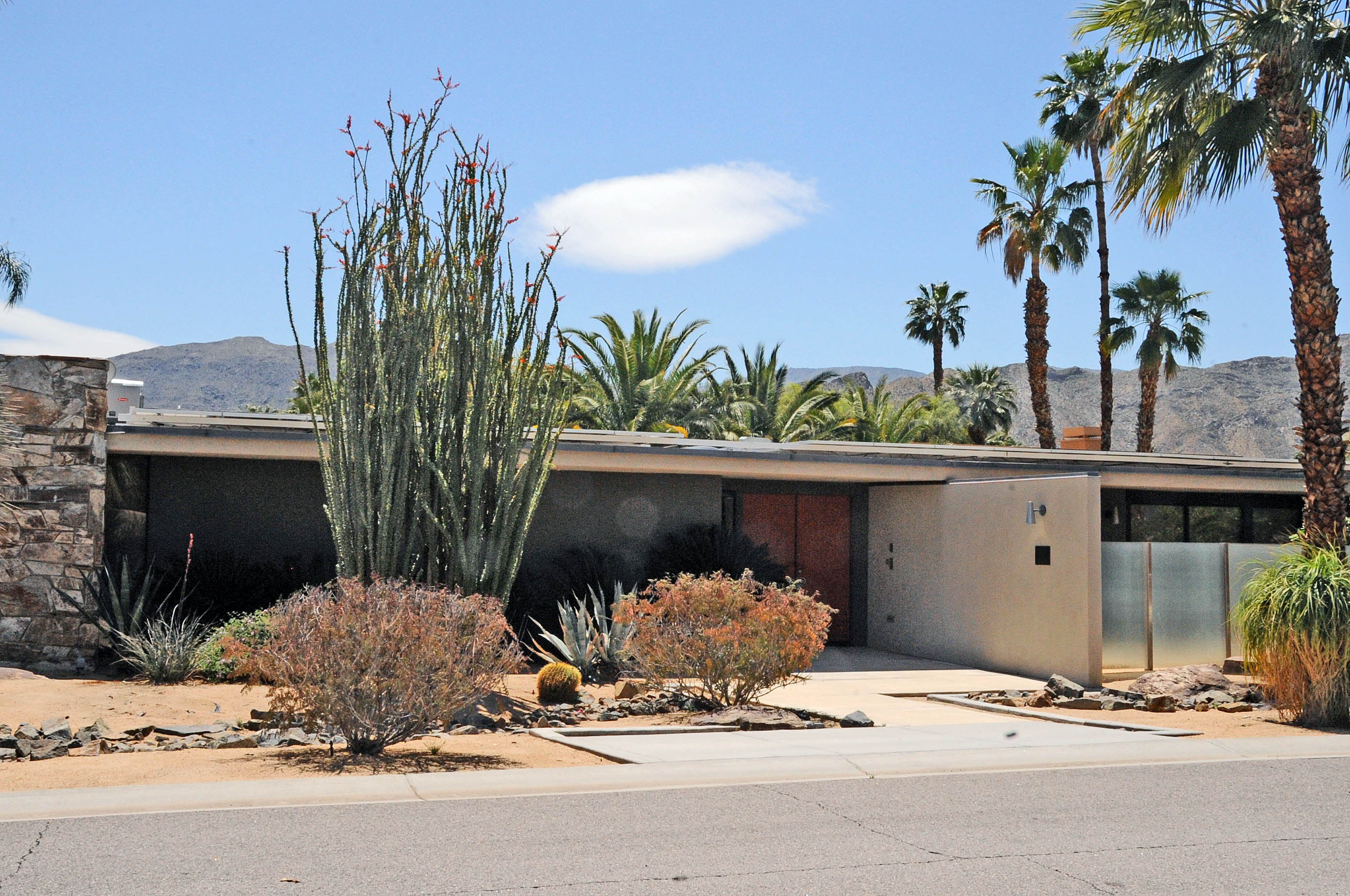

- Location within California Location within the United States
- Location: 39767 Desert Sun Dr. Rancho Mirage, California
- Coordinates: 33°45′34.4″N 116°25′4.8″W
- Area: less than one acre
- Built: 1957
- Architect: E. Stewart Williams
- Architectural style: Modern Movement
- MPS: Architecture of E. Stewart Williams MPS
- NRHP reference No.: 16000887
- Added to NRHP: December 27, 2016

The Kenaston House is a historic building located in Rancho Mirage, California. The building is a fine example of the residences that master architect E. Stewart Williams designed between 1947 and the end of the 1960s. The single-story structure features a flat roof, deep overhangs, and large glass surface areas with sliding glass doors that facilitate its indoor-outdoor flow. He also integrated natural materials into the design that includes native rock used on some of the interior and exterior walls, and wood finishes that are used for the interior cabinets, doors, and walls. The house was listed on the National Register of Historic Places in 2016.

== In popular culture ==
The reality television series Boy Meets Boy was partially set at the Kenaston House.
