= Coachella Valley Savings No. 2 =

- U.S. National Register of Historic Places
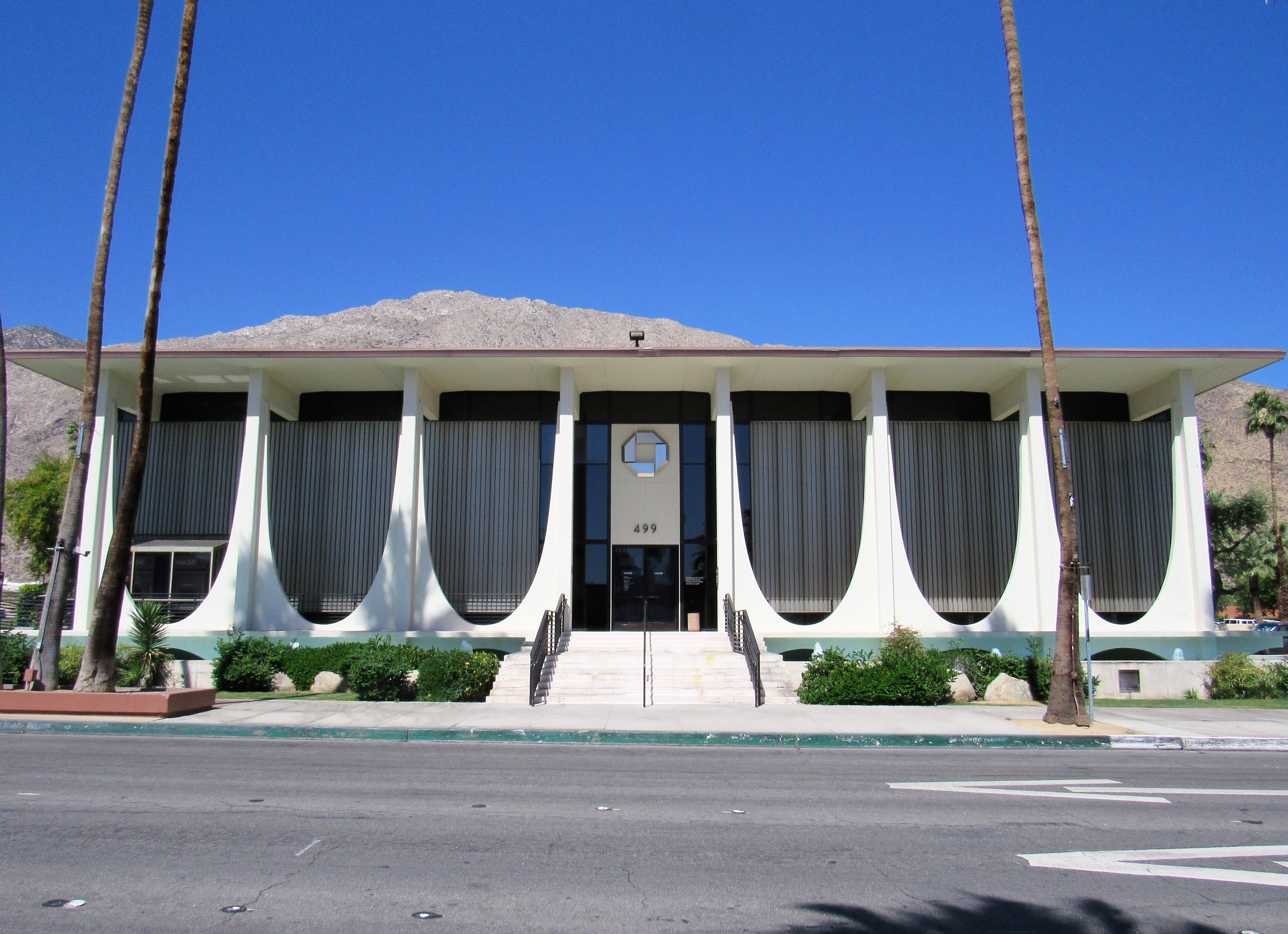

- Location within California Location within the United States
- Location: 499 S. Palm Canyon Dr. Palm Springs, California
- Coordinates: 33°48′58.1″N 116°32′49.7″W
- Area: less than one acre
- Built: 1961
- Architect: E. Stewart Williams
- Architectural style: Modern Movement
- MPS: Architecture of E. Stewart Williams MPS
- NRHP reference No.: 16000885
- Added to NRHP: December 27, 2016

Coachella Valley Savings No. 2, also known as Coachella Valley Savings & Loan Association, Washington Mutual, and Chase Bank is a historic building located in Palm Springs, California. The building is a fine example of the short span of time that master architect E. Stewart Williams used the International Style of architecture for commercial buildings in the early 1960s. It features a flat roof, deep overhangs, steel-frame construction, and a lack of applied ornamentation. The most prominent feature of the structure are the inverted arches of reinforced concrete that rise to form columns that hold up the roof. The building was listed on the National Register of Historic Places in 2016.

== See also ==
- Coachella Valley Savings No. 1
