= Palm Springs Aerial Tramway Mountain Station =

- U.S. National Register of Historic Places
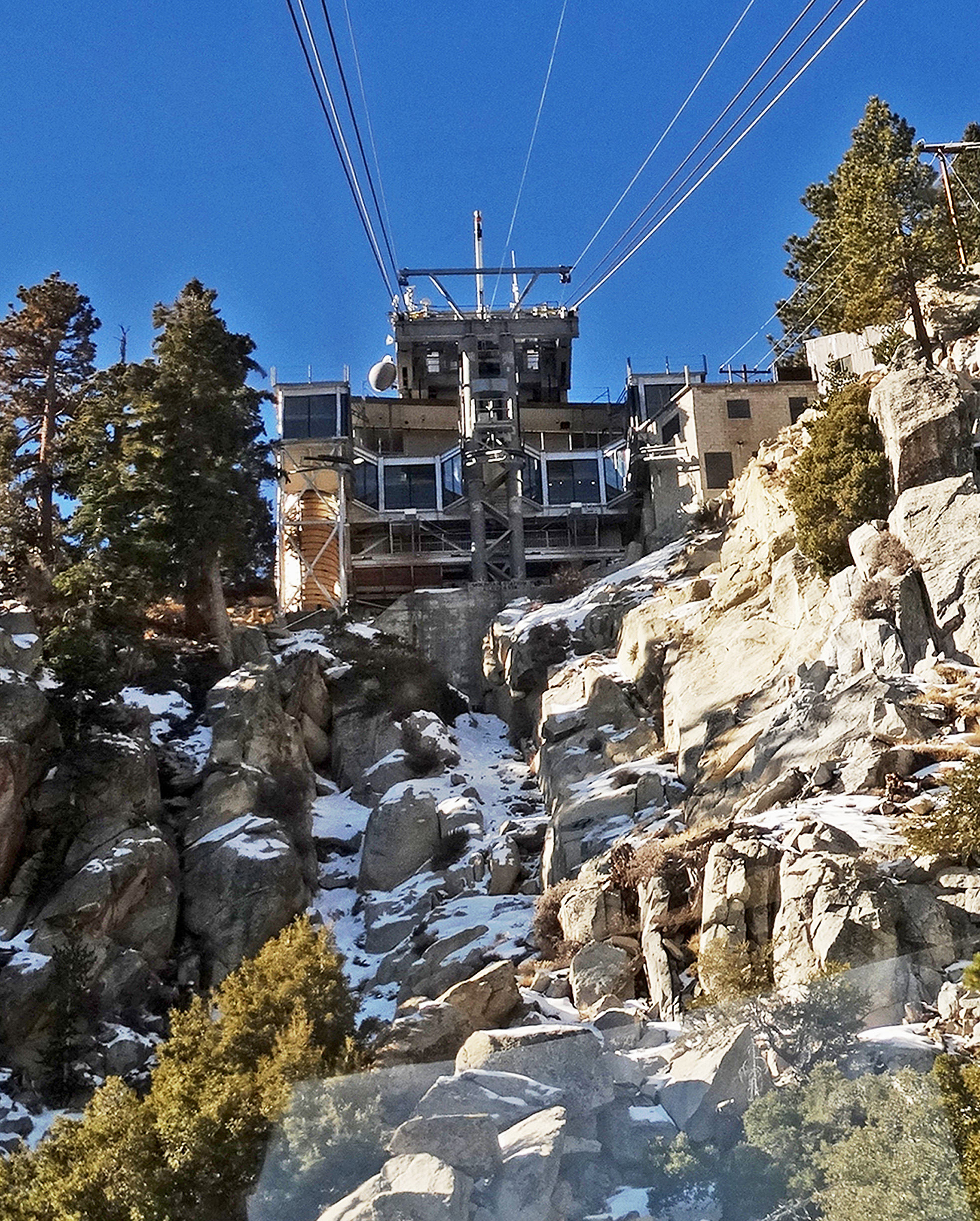

- Location within California Location within the United States
- Location: 1 Tram Way, Mount San Jacinto State Park
- Nearest city: Idyllwild, California
- Coordinates: 33°48′46.9″N 116°38′20.5″W
- Area: less than one acre
- Built: 1963
- Architect: E. Stewart Williams
- Architectural style: Modern Movement
- MPS: Architecture of E. Stewart Williams MPS
- NRHP reference No.: 16000889
- Added to NRHP: December 27, 2016

The Palm Springs Aerial Tramway Mountain Station, also known as Palm Springs Aerial Tramway Alpine Station, is a historic building located in Mount San Jacinto State Park near Idyllwild, California. The building is a fine example of a commercial building designed by Palm Springs architect E. Stewart Williams for the Palm Springs Aerial Tramway. It is located at an elevation of 8,516 feet (2,596 m), and its design is based on a Swiss chalet with large windows to take in views of the surrounding forests and the desert in the Coachella Valley below. The three-story structure follows a Y-plan with its main elevation to the north. The building's lower levels, which contains the tram's mechanical equipment and receives the tramway cars, are composed of reinforced concrete. The upper level is mostly composed of wood and glass. A concrete wrap-around viewing deck is found on the north and east elevations, and a wood staircase descends to the mountain hiking paths. The interior features a cocktail lounge, dining room, and fireplaces. The building was listed on the National Register of Historic Places in 2016.
