= Twin Palms =

Historic house in California, United States

- Frank Sinatra House
- U.S. National Register of Historic Places
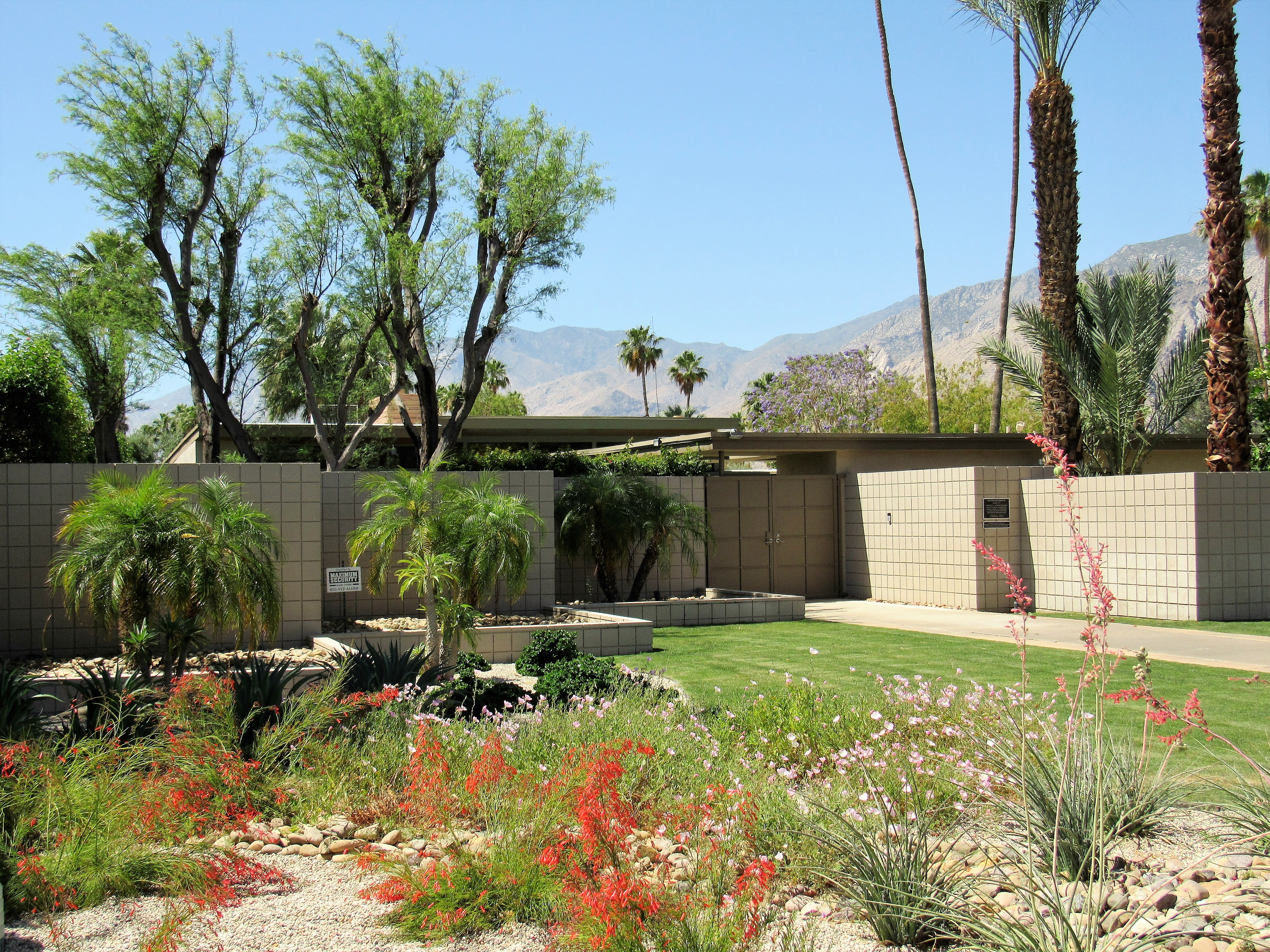

- Location within California Location within the United States
- Location: 1148 E. Alejo Rd. Palm Springs, California
- Coordinates: 33°49′52″N 116°32′01″W
- Built: 1947
- Architect: E. Stewart Williams
- Architectural style: Mid-century modern
- MPS: Architecture of E. Stewart Williams MPS
- NRHP reference No.: 16000893
- Added to NRHP: December 27, 2016

Twin Palms, also known as the Frank Sinatra House, at 1148 East Alejo Rd is a mid-century modern house in the Movie Colony East neighborhood of Palm Springs, California. The house was designed by E. Stewart Williams, to a commission from the American singer and actor Frank Sinatra. The house was Williams's first residential commission.

== History ==
Sinatra started coming to Palm Springs in the late 1940s. He had been told about it by his close friend, the composer Jimmy Van Heusen, who had stopped for fuel there while flying to Los Angeles. Van Heusen told Sinatra of the beauty of the desert later that day, and Sinatra insisted that they fly there that evening. Fellow acquaintances of Sinatra's who had also started frequenting Palm Springs in the 1940s included Lana Turner and Dinah Shore, and the actress Ava Gardner who was to become his second wife. On 1 May 1947 Sinatra walked into the offices of E. Stewart Williams, wearing a white sailor cap and eating an ice cream cone, and requested that the firm build him a Georgian style house as a weekend residence; he had recently signed a film contract with Metro-Goldwyn-Mayer, and had made his first $1 million. Feeling that the Georgian style was unsuitable for the extremes of the desert environment, Williams showed Sinatra two architectural drawings, one of the Georgian design, and the other of a single-storey modern house. Sinatra chose the modern design, and the house was to be Williams's first residential commission. Williams's brother and architectural partner, Roger, later said that he was "so glad" that Sinatra chose the modern design, believing that "We'd have been ruined if we'd been forced to build Georgian in the desert". Sinatra demanded that the house be completed in time for a Christmas party he intended to host.

The house was eventually finished shortly before the new year at a cost of $150,000. Sinatra lived in the house from its completion in 1947 to 1954, and sold it in 1957. Before selling it, Sinatra rented the house to Moss Hart so that he and Judy Garland could re-write A Star is Born. Twin Palms was subsequently photographed by Julius Shulman.

The house was later occupied by a Texas couple for 43 years who let it become dilapidated, until its 1997 sale for $135,000. It was subsequently sold in 2000 for $1,345,000 and for $2.9 million in 2005. Twin Palms was offered for sale in 2010 for $3.25 million.

== Design ==
Twin Palms is a single-story residential building, 4,500sq ft in size with 4 bedrooms and 7 bathrooms, constructed around long horizontal lines framed with steel and aluminum and windows that stretch to the ground. The house has a flat and slightly sloping roof, and a piano shaped swimming pool, the design of which was entirely accidental. The house is named for the two palm trees that stand next to it. The house would become an early emblematic example of a style known as desert modernism.

== See also ==
- 70588 Frank Sinatra Drive, Sinatra's Rancho Mirage, CA residence from 1956 to 1995
