= Coachella Valley Savings No. 1 =

- U.S. National Register of Historic Places
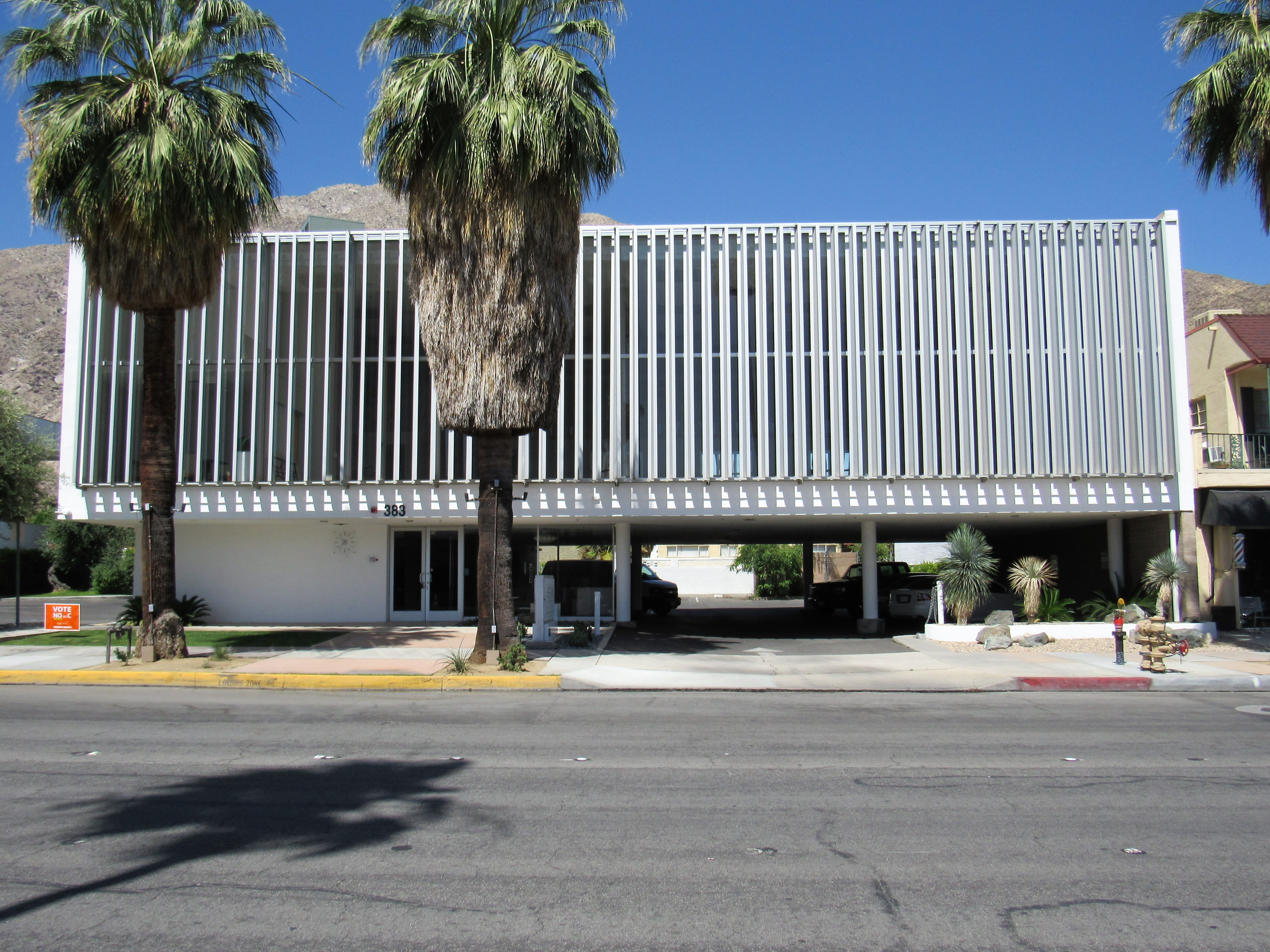
- Location: 383 S. Palm Canyon Dr. Palm Springs, California
- Built: 1955
- Architect: E. Stewart Williams
- Architectural style: Modern Movement
- MPS: Architecture of E. Stewart Williams MPS
- NRHP reference No.: 16000884
- Added to NRHP: December 27, 2016

Coachella Valley Savings No. 1 is a historic modernist building located in Palm Springs, California. Designed by architect E. Stewart Williams and completed in the mid-1950s, it originally served as a savings and loan institution before being renovated into an event space known as The Bank Palm Springs.

== History ==
The building was commissioned as the first branch of Coachella Valley Savings and Loan, the first of several bank buildings to be designed by E. Stewart Williams. Constructed in 1955, it formed part of the Palm Springs financial district along South Palm Canyon Drive during the 1950s and 1960s, an area densely populated with financial institutions between Baristo Road and Ramon Road. It was eventually flanked by other Williams-designed banks, including Santa Fe Federal Savings and Loan (now the Palm Springs Art Museum Architecture and Design Center) and a Coachella Valley Savings No. 2 (currently occupied by Chase Bank). The building is recognized as one of Williams' major projects in the Coachella Valley.

== Design ==
Coachella Valley Savings No. 1 exemplifies mid-century modern architecture, blending functional International Style elements with local desert adaptations. The structure is a simple white cube elevated on columns for covered parking beneath, featuring floor-to-ceiling glass windows shielded by vertical aluminum louvers. Interior features include a floating terrazzo staircase, black terrazzo floors, wood paneling, and a curved native rock wall.
