= Southern Hotel (Perris, California) =

- U.S. National Register of Historic Places
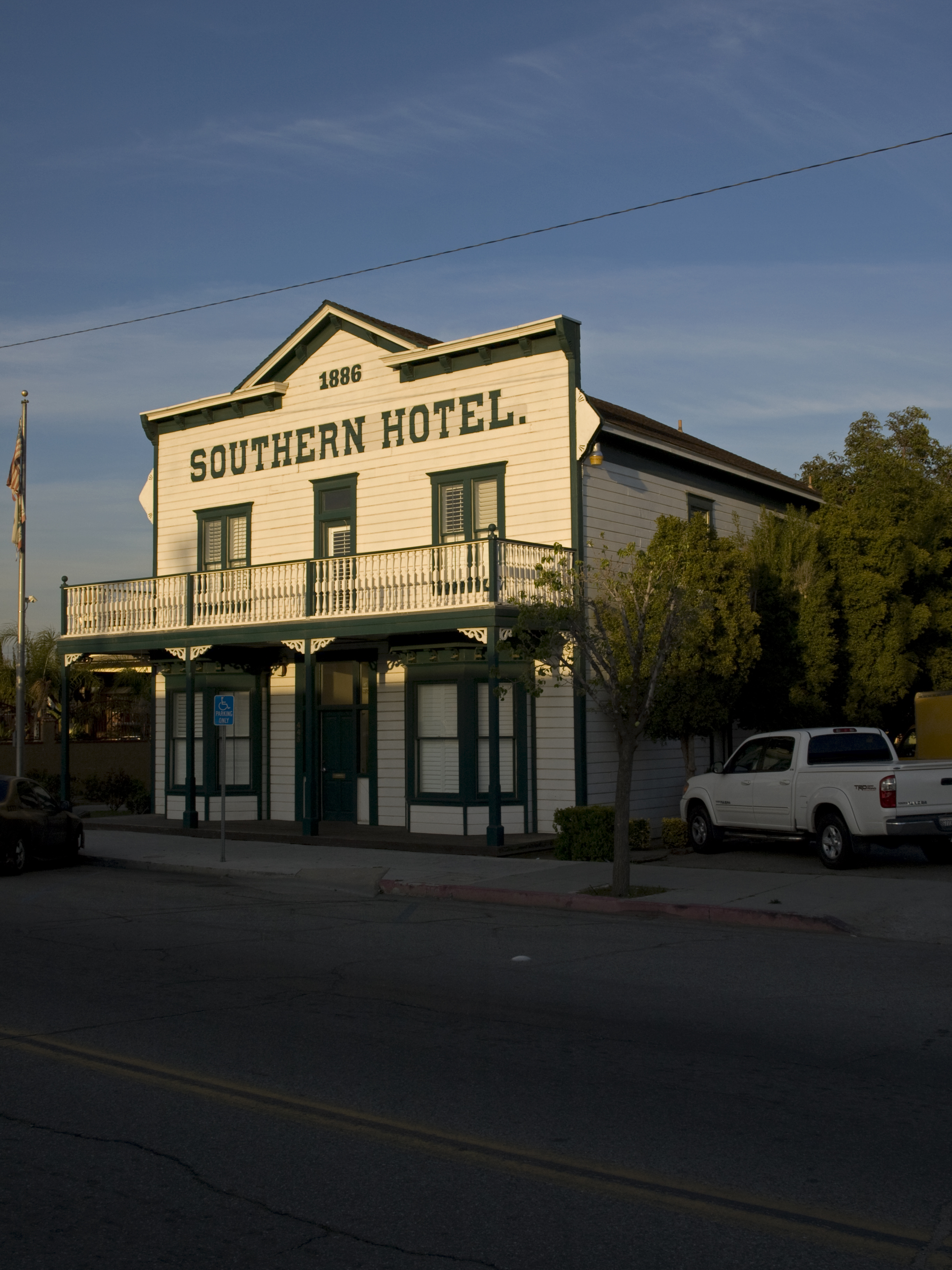
- Southern Hotel

- Location within California Location within the United States
- Location: 445 S. D St., Perris, California
- Coordinates: 33°46′54.6″N 117°13′42.3″W
- Built: 1886
- Architectural style: Italianate
- NRHP reference No.: 92001384
- Added to NRHP: October 15, 1992

Southern Hotel in Perris, California was built in 1886. It was listed on the National Register of Historic Places in 1992. It is located at 445 S. D Street in the center of the city. Along with the Perris Depot, this is one of the two significant 19th century buildings still standing in the city.

== History ==
Southern Hotel is the oldest surviving commercial building in Perris, built by Swiss immigrant couple, Bernardo and Marcellina Bernasconi. Bernardo Bernasconi was a rancher, and the family had six children. It was used as a hotel serving the San Jacinto - Perris stage line until approximately 1919, when it was converted into Bernasconi family residence. Matilda Bernasconi, the oldest child of the original builders, lived in the building until her death, after which the structure fell into a state of disrepair. In 1987, there were two arson fires, and the building was close to being demolished. In 1990, it was bought by the Motte brothers, restored, and converted into a museum (Motte Historical Museum).

Before 1885, the area was known as Pinacate, now in the southern part of the city of Perris. Perris received a railway station in 1886 and soon after the Southern Hotel became one of the first buildings in the area.

== Architecture ==
The hotel is a Victorian Era style building, two-storey wooden and rectangular. It bears a number of Italianate features and decorative elements. Proviously, the building was adjacent to other commercial structures, but currently it stands alone.

The front of the building faces west (S. D Street) and is made in horizontal sidings. It features a door, two windows with decorative crowns, and an open wooden porch with four support posts.
