= Palm Springs Art Museum =

American art museum on California

Palm Springs Art Museum (PSAM)
- Main location in Palm Springs

- Location within California
- Former name: Palm Springs Desert Museum
- Established: 1938
- Location: PSAM (main); 101 Museum Drive, Palm Springs, CA, 92262 Architecture & Design Center; 300 S. Palm Canyon; Palm Springs, CA Faye Sarkowsky Sculpture Garden; 72-567 Highway 111, Palm Desert, California 92260
- Coordinates: 33°49′27″N 116°33′00″W
- Type: Visual and performing arts
- Accreditation: American Alliance of Museums
- Collection size: ≈ 24,000 objects
- Director: Christine Vendredi
- Architect: E. Stewart Williams
- Public transit access: SunLine Transit Agency; Palm Springs: Routes 111, 14, 24, 30, 32; Palm Desert: Routes 111, 32, 50
- Website: http://www.psmuseum.org/

The Palm Springs Art Museum (formerly the Palm Springs Desert Museum) is a visual and performing arts institution with several locations in the Coachella Valley, in Riverside County, California, United States, founded in 1938. PSAM has been focused on design and contemporary art since 2004. PSAM houses an art museum and an Architecture and Design Center in Palm Springs, California, along with the Faye Sarkowsky Sculpture Garden at a satellite location in Palm Desert.

== History ==
=== Desert Museum years ===
The Palm Springs Desert Museum originated in 1938 in La Plaza Arcade, a gathering place for residents, on Palm Canyon Drive near in central Palm Springs. The early museum focused on the Colorado Desert and the Cahuilla and other Indigenous Americans. The museum grew and was temporarily relocated within a section of the town's library. During World War II, the museum was operated by biologist T. D. A. Cockerell. In 1947, the museum was moved into a section of a converted wartime hospital. Folk singer and marine biologist Sam Hinton served as director from 1942 to 1944. The Desert Museum focused on natural science and Indigenous American collections and programs. In 1952, the museum added a desert wildlife reserve habitat and a botanical garden.

=== Art museum ===
The Desert Museum started to transition to an art museum in 1953 when desert landscape paintings by Carl Eytel were donated by Cornelia White, Isabel Chase, and Earl Coffman. A 10,000-square-foot (930 m^{2}) structure was built for the Art Museum in downtown Palm Springs in 1958. In 1962, the museum added an auditorium and more gallery space to house contemporary art exhibitions. The executive director, anthropologist Frederick Sleight was credited with guiding the transformation.

Architect E. Stewart Williams designed a 75,000-square-foot (7,000 m^{2}) building in the Modernist architectural style for the third location of the museum. When the art museum was established, the desert wildlife reserve museum component became the Living Desert Zoo and Gardens, an independent public institution. The Williams-designed building was listed on the National Register of Historic Places in 2016.

In 2003, the museum experienced financial difficulty, following debt incurred during its 1990s expansion phase. That year, retired banker Harold J. Meyerman joined the museum board; he became its chairman in 2006 and served until his death in 2015. Under Meyerman, the museum pursued financial stability through steps such as increasing its endowment from $6 million to $15.5 million, reducing staff, and raising fees for local groups using the museum's facilities.

== Museum scope ==
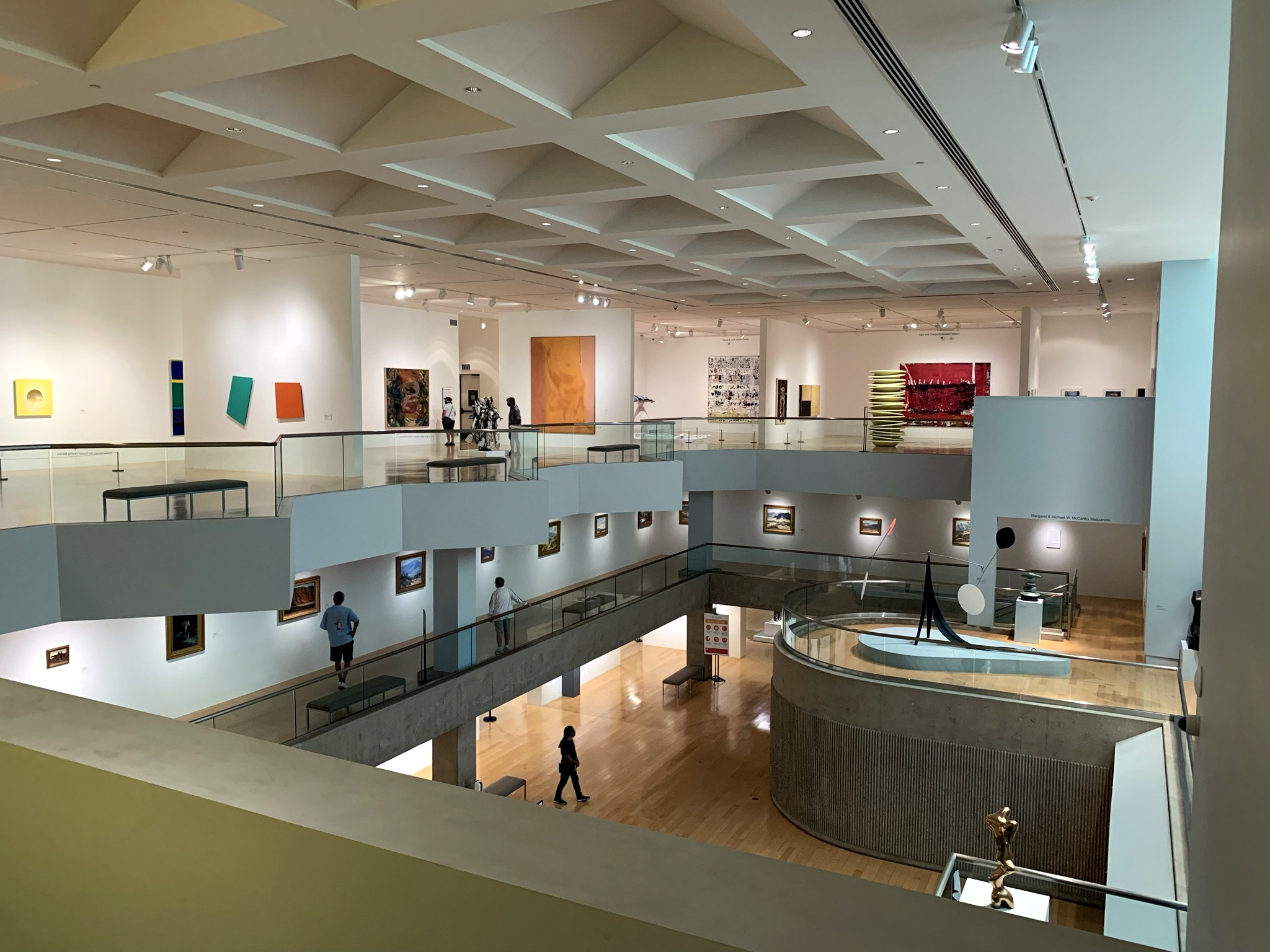
Palm Springs Art Museum, 2021

Emphases of the Palm Springs Art Museum developed into three areas:

- Art: contemporary art, sculpture, studio art glass, and architecture archives
- Natural Science
- Performing Arts

Educational programs related to each of the three disciplines were planned, and the new Palm Springs Desert Museum opened to the public in January 1976. The museum expanded again in 1982 with the addition of the Denney Western American Art Wing, the museum was renamed the Palm Springs Art Museum, and classic American western art was added to the collection's fine art emphasis.

=== Art and natural science ===
The permanent collection consists of more than 24,000 objects. 12,000 objects include fine art, fine art photography, photographic archives, Native American art, Mesoamerican art and artifacts from other cultures. The natural science collections are categorized in geology, biology and archaeology. 12,000 specimens include ceramics, lithics, tools, weapons, minerals, fossils, rocks, casts of fossils, herbaria, mounted invertebrates, preserved amphibians and reptiles, study skins and whole mounts of birds and mammals.

==== Notable artists ====
Noted landscape artists with works displayed or curated by the museum include:

- John James Audubon
- Carl Oscar Borg
- Alson S. Clark
- Edward S. Curtis
- Carl Eytel
- Nicolai Fechin
- Leon Gaspard
- Philip R. Goodwin
- Paul A. Grimm
- Woody Gwyn
- Thomas Hill
- Grace Carpenter Hudson
- Frank Tenney Johnson
- William Keith
- Sydney Laurence
- George Montgomery
- Thomas Moran
- Edgar Alwin Payne
- Agnes Pelton
- Frederic Remington
- Carl Rungius
- Charles Marion Russell
- Millard Sheets
- James Swinnerton
- Walter Ufer
- Harold Joe Waldrum
- Stephen H. Willard

=== Performing arts ===
The 437-seat Annenberg Theater presents internationally known performers and concert artists in music, dance and theater.

== Growth and accreditation ==
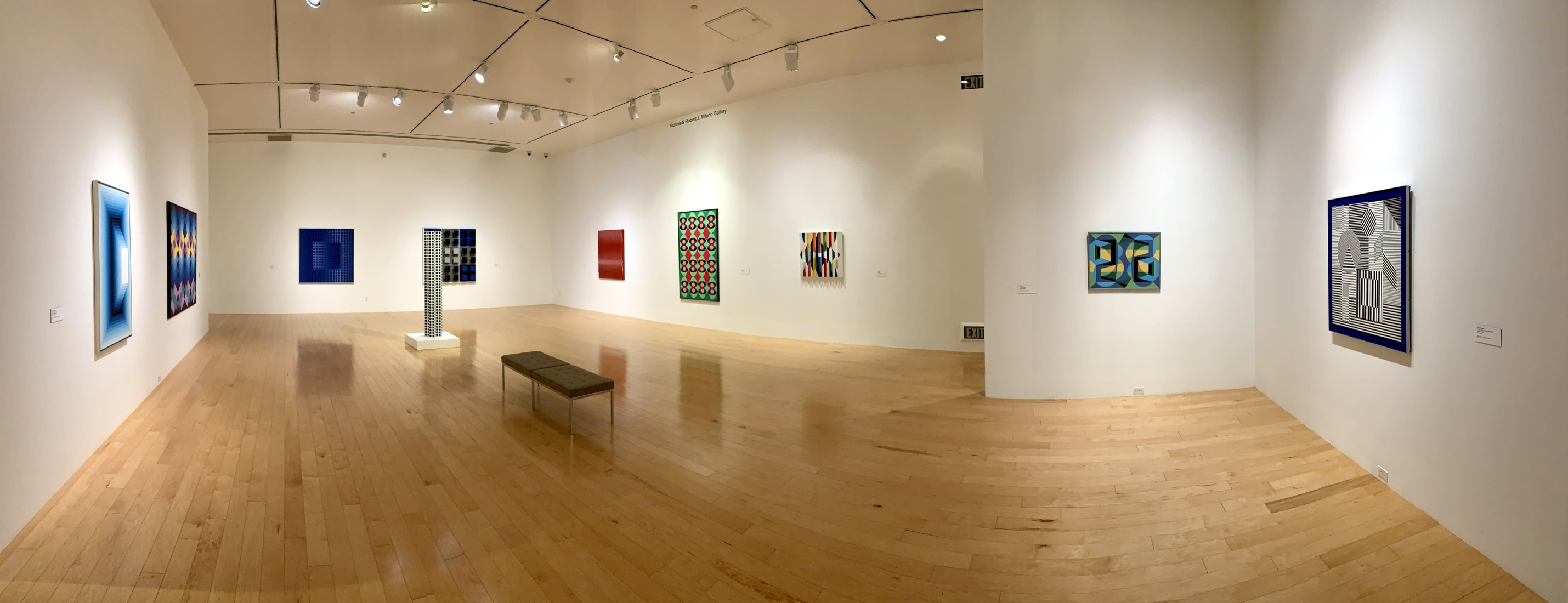
Palm Springs Art Museum, 2021

The museum received accreditation from the American Alliance of Museums in 1982.

The museum building had originally been designed with the possibility of adding a third level. The need for more exhibition space and educational facilities was recognized by the Board of Trustees, noting increased population and tourism in the Coachella Valley, in addition to the museum's growing collection. An expansion project was initiated with a gift of $1.5 million seed money and a donation of 132 artworks from the personal collection of designer and collector Steve Chase.

The Steve Chase Art Wing and Education Center, also designed by E. Stewart Williams, opened in November 1996. The expansion included 25,000 additional square feet of gallery space, a mezzanine, a sculpture terrace, four classrooms, two art storage vaults, and a 90-seat lecture hall. The Palm Springs Museum complex grew to encompass 124,435 square feet (11,560.4 m^{2}), with additional exhibition space in Palm Desert as of March 2012.

== Palm Springs Art Museum in Palm Desert ==
On March 15, 2012, the museum opened a satellite facility in the nearby community of Palm Desert, California. The inaugural exhibition was "Rodin to Now", a survey of modern sculpture from the French sculptor Auguste Rodin. Contemporary artists whose works have been displayed at the Palm Springs Art Museum in Palm Desert include Tracey Emin, Anthony Gormley, Lino Tagliapietra, Klaus Moje, Richard Marquis, Karen LaMonte and Jennifer Steinkamp.

== Architecture and Design Center ==
In 2011, the museum purchased the Santa Fe Federal Savings & Loan building, also a Palm Springs building designed by the architect E. Stewart Williams in 1961. PSAM converted the building into exhibition space and opened it to the public as the Architecture and Design Center, Edwards Harris Pavilion, in 2014. The opening exhibition showed the desert modern style work of Williams. The building was renovated for PSAM by the Marmol Radziner architecture firm of Los Angeles.

== See also ==
- Edmund Jaeger – noted naturalist who helped establish the Desert Museum
- List of public art in Palm Springs, California
- National Register of Historic Places listings in Riverside County, California
