= Koerner House (Palm Springs, California) =

Historic house in California, United States

- U.S. National Register of Historic Places
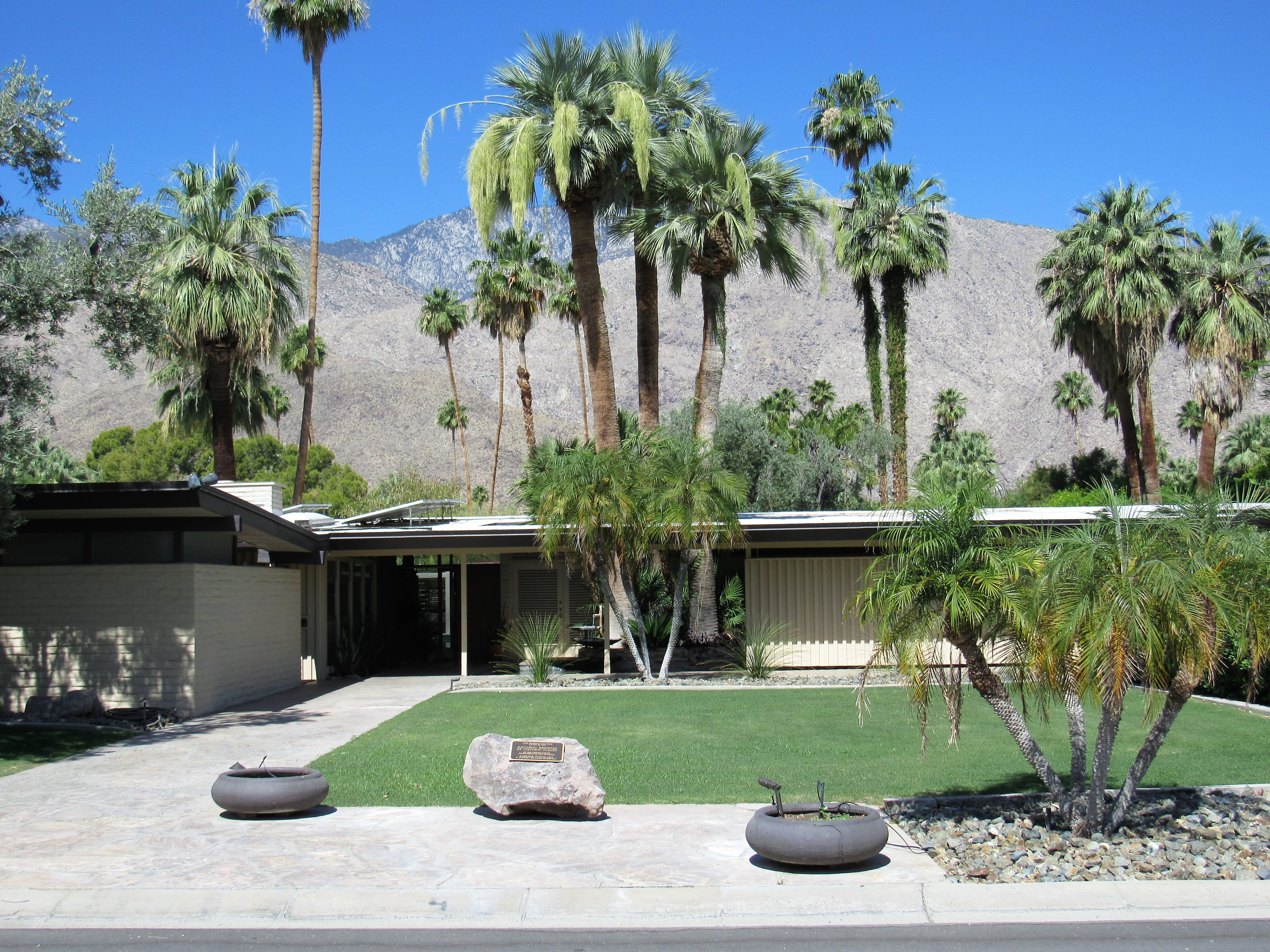

- Location within California Location within the United States
- Location: 1275 S. Calle de Maria; Palm Springs, California
- Coordinates: 33°48′22.4″N 116°31′57.3″W
- Area: less than one acre
- Built: 1955
- Architect: E. Stewart Williams
- Architectural style: Modern Movement
- MPS: Architecture of E. Stewart Williams MPS
- NRHP reference No.: 16000888
- Added to NRHP: December 27, 2016

The Koerner House is a historic building located in Palm Springs, California. The house was designed in 1955 for the Vancouver-based couple of Leon Koerner and Thea Koerner.

The house is a fine example of the residences that master architect E. Stewart Williams designed between 1947 and the end of the 1960s. The single-story structure features a shed roof, deep overhangs, and large glass surface areas with sliding glass doors that facilitate its indoor-outdoor flow. He also integrated natural wood that was utilized for its post-and-beam construction, board-and-batten cladding, interior cabinets, closets and built-in furniture. The landscaping was designed by Eckbo, Royston and Williams. The house was listed on the National Register of Historic Places in 2016.
