= Martinez Canyon Rockhouse =

Historic house in California, United States

- Martinez Rock House
- U.S. National Register of Historic Places
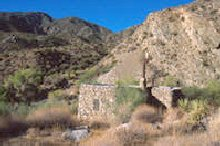
- Jack Miller Cabin

- Location within California Location within the United States
- Location: Santa Rosa Mountains
- Coordinates: 33.5055°N 116.3262°W
- Built: 1930's
- Architectural style: Vernacular architecture
- NRHP reference No.: 99001471
- Added to NRHP: December 14, 1999

The Martinez Canyon Rock House, which is also known as Jack Miller's Cabin is a Stone cabin located deep within the Santa Rosa Mountains Wilderness Area. The Cabin is a two-room vernacular style dwelling built sometime in the 1930s. The homestead/miners camp is constructed of cement with a facade of local river rock. In 1999, the Martinez Canyon Rockhouse was listed on the National Register of Historic Places. the Nearest Modern-day Towns are on the West Pinyon Pines (10 Miles) and on the east Valerie (9.8 Miles)

== History ==
The Martinez Canyon Rockhouse, also known as Jack Millers Cabin, is a two-room vernacular style dwelling built approximately in 1930. The Martinez Canyon stream passes by the cabin about seventy feet to the south and also passes east of the cabin since at this juncture the stream turns from south to an easterly direction. At this point the stream supports huge cottonwood trees. Except in the very driest of years, this stream sufficiently supplies the cabin with fresh water the year round. The cabin is situated on a low bench that is relatively level and which supports the remnants of a small garden behind and east of the cabin. No vegetal materials remain in the garden which might allow us to identify what crops had been planted. Throughout the garden and portions of the surrounding cabin yard are prehistoric remains of chipped stone debitage and Tizon Brown pottery. One granitic bedrock outcrop supports a metate. A shovel test probe in the garden revealed about 10 cm of mostly intact subsurface deposition. Based upon surface artifacts, the site dates to the late prehistoric period. The archaeological component is not considered a contributing element.

=== Construction ===
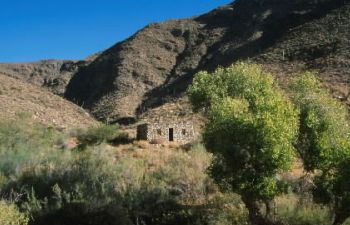
Jack Miller Cabin is located in the Santa Rosa Mountain Wilderness

This two-room homestead/miners camp is constructed of cement with a facade of local river rock. The cabin walls are constructed of thirteen 4" X 8" cement lifts (forms). The cement forms that run the length of the walls have a high content of local small river rock. The outside ornamental river rocks average four to six inches in diameter and were placed with mortar while the interior cement forms were still drying. The outside rocks therefore also serve to stabilize the walls. At a point three concrete forms, approximately 16", below the ceiling, the walls are braced with true 2" X 4" beams. At the top of the highest form, there are eleven 2" X 4" beams which have been laid parallel to the support beams. These run north–south across the narrow span. The ceiling is constructed of 1" X 6" tongue and groove planks laid across the 2" X 4" beams and covered with tar paper. The seams and edges were sealed with hot tar. Over the tar paper has been laid, galvanized tin siding. This form of roof construction forms a flat roof with cement walls extending above the roof approximately six inches. For the purposes of roof drainage, a four-inch diameter -tin pipe has been extended from the roof through the cement and rock wall.

After the walls were poured, the floor was poured in segments. These cement floor segments vary in size, with portions of the slab floor supported to the east by either lumber, rock, or concrete footings. It was impossible to determine what exactly was used as supports since no view of the underside of the floor is possible. These supports, of whatever material, were necessary due to the asymmetrical surface of the ground. The cabin sports six wooden framed windows and two fireplaces. A river rock fireplace is located on the north wall in the main room and a much smaller fireplace is in the kitchen. The front door and side doors, as well as the window frames, have been transported from town since they are of a mercantile grade. On the south (front) of the house is a wide dirt, open-level surface which measures 5' by 35' and is outlined with rocks. Leading down from this area are seven small boulders positioned as steps. Constructed at the bottom, some 20 feet below are two posts connected by an old wire which was used to tether mules or burros. Fifty feet southwest of the house is a historic period rock and earthen oven or "hornito". Forty feet west of the house stands a cement and rock forge which may also have been used as a smelter, judging by the associated ladle and smelting equipment nearby. These associated activity areas date from the same period as the cabin. The property is in overall excellent condition and has had minimal attention since its construction, in about 1930. The setting has changed little and the environment and structures reflect the individual miner and his residence and occupation during the early 20th century.

=== Hiking Trail ===
Apparently, Jack Miller built a road up the canyon, back in the day, but it washed out in a big flood in 1976. Now Access to the "Martinez Canyon Trail" trailhead starts at Van Buren and 68th Ave. into the base of the canyon. It is a 20-mile out-and-back Trail following a stream into eventually reaching the stone cabin. Inside the Cabin Hikers who make the voyage leave their names on a Paper sheet inside the structure and sometimes may camp inside where two beds remain.

== See also ==
- Santa Rosa Mountains
