= Paul A. Grimm =

South-African born American painter

Paul A. Grimm (January 11, 1891 – December 30, 1974) was an artist born to German parents in South Africa. As a small child, he moved with his parents to the United States. He reportedly was seen as having artistic talent as a child and, as an adult, attended a university-level art school in New York. Between 1910 and 1920, he reportedly went to South America for a few years before returning to the United States and settling in Southern California.

Grimm gained much of his present-day fame by painting landscapes of southern California in the 1920s. Many works depict alluvial fans and desert vegetation in the eastern half of Riverside County. The San Jacinto Mountains appear frequently in his work. Most of the works are oil on canvas. To a viewer untrained in art, his work looks similar to desert landscapes of Karl Albert (1911–2007). A residence on Calle Palo Fierro in the Warm Sands neighborhood of Palm Springs was built for Grimm in 1935. He had a studio on Palm Canyon Drive in Palm Springs from the 1950s until his death in 1974.

His work is held by the Palm Springs Art Museum, the Picerne Arizona Landmark Collection at the Desert Caballeros Western Museum in Wickenburg, Arizona, and the Irvine Museum Collection at the University of California, Irvine. Grimm's works have been part of numerous exhibitions at the Irvine.
