= Palm Springs Unified School District Educational Administrative Center =

- U.S. National Register of Historic Places
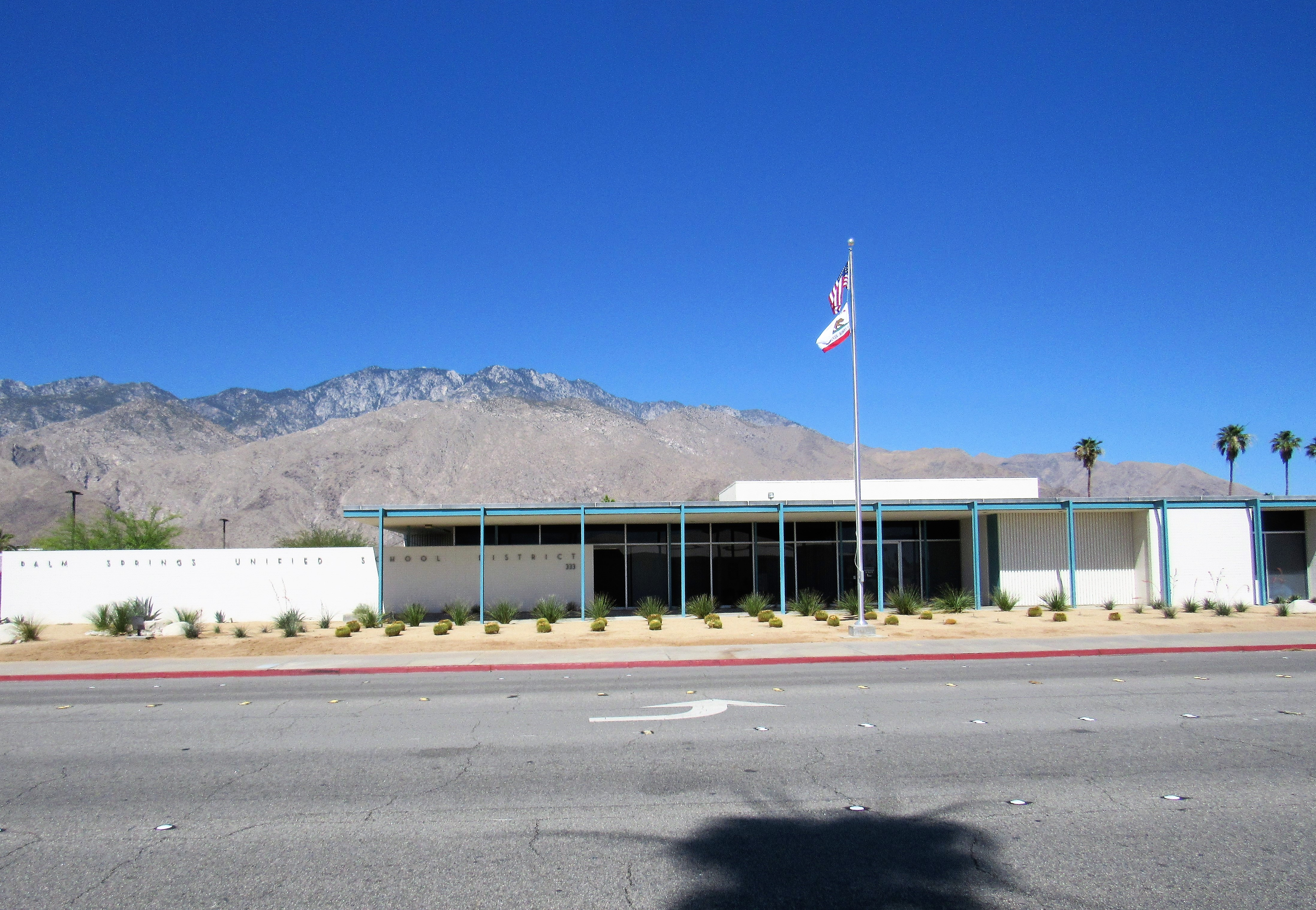

- Location within California Location within the United States
- Location: 333 S. Farrell Dr. Palm Springs, California
- Coordinates: 33°49′8.3″N 116°31′5.7″W
- Area: less than one acre
- Built: 1960
- Architect: E. Stewart Williams
- Architectural style: Modern Movement
- MPS: Architecture of E. Stewart Williams MPS
- NRHP reference No.: 16000891
- Added to NRHP: December 27, 2016

Palm Springs Unified School District Educational Administrative Center is a historic building located in Palm Springs, California. The building is an example of the short span of time that master architect E. Stewart Williams used the International Style of architecture for educational buildings in the early 1960s. It features a flat roof, deep overhangs, steel-frame construction, and large glass surfaces. After the mid-1960s Williams employed New Brutalism for educational structures. The building is located on the campus of Palm Springs High School. Its original lawn has been replaced by drought resistant desert landscaping. The building was listed on the National Register of Historic Places in 2016.
