= E. Stewart and Mari Williams House =

Historic house in California, United States

- U.S. National Register of Historic Places
- Location: 1314 Culver Place; Palm Springs, California
- Area: less than one acre
- Built: 1955
- Architect: E. Stewart Williams
- Architectural style: Modern Movement
- MPS: Architecture of E. Stewart Williams MPS
- NRHP reference No.: 16000894
- Added to NRHP: December 27, 2016

The E. Stewart and Mari Williams House is a historic building located at 1314 Culver Place in Palm Springs, California. The house is a fine example of the residences that master architect E. Stewart Williams designed between 1947 and the end of the 1960s. The single-story structure features an open floor plan, a low-slung roof, deep overhangs, and large glass surface areas with sliding glass doors that facilitate its indoor-outdoor flow. He also integrated natural materials and the desert into the house's design with rock planters and boulders that penetrate the glass walls in the living room and merge with a fire pit next to the seating area. Williams built this house for his family's residence, but the swimming pool was added by a later owner. The house was listed on the National Register of Historic Places in 2016.
