= Santa Fe Federal Savings and Loan Association =

- U.S. National Register of Historic Places
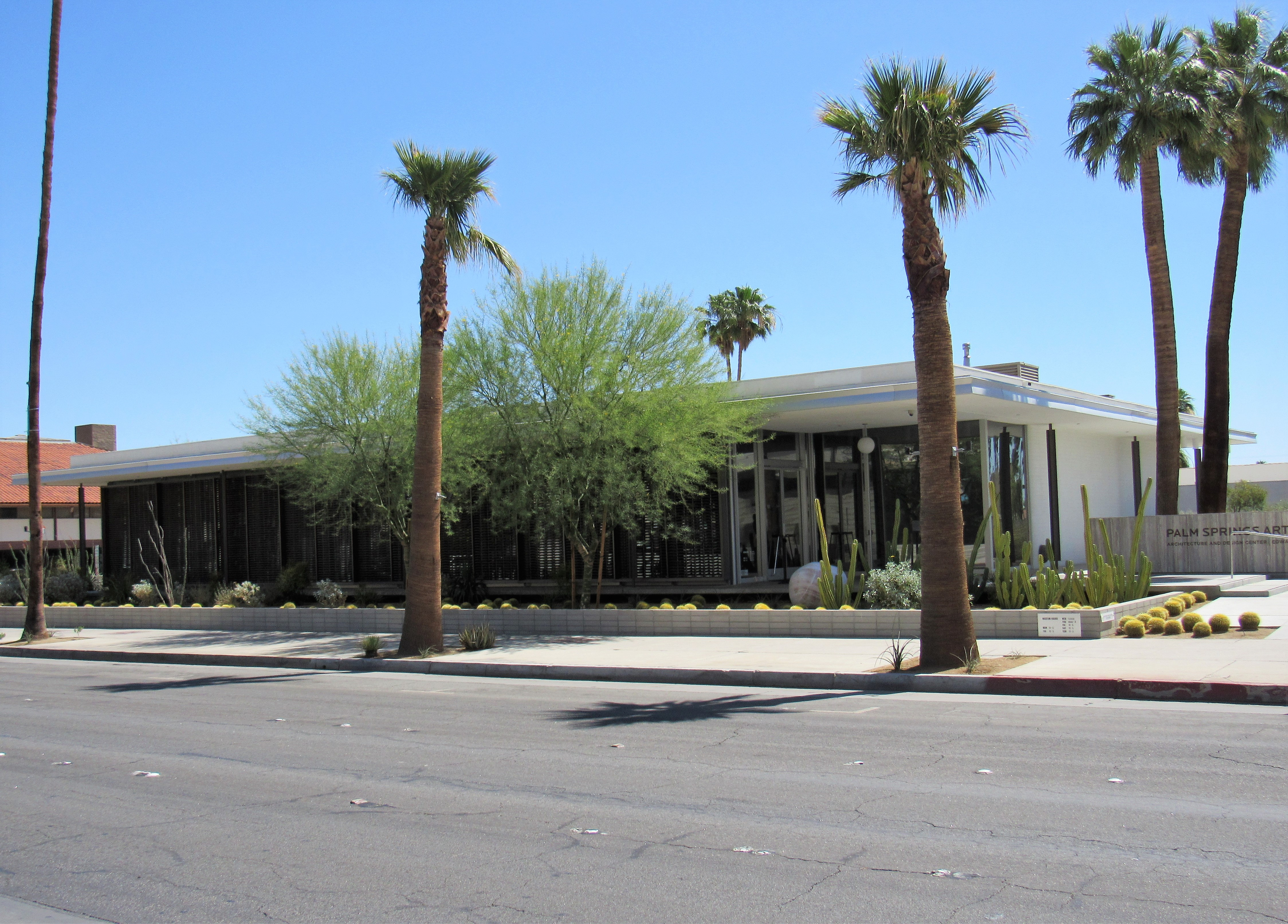

- Location within California Location within the United States
- Location: 300 S. Palm Canyon Dr. Palm Springs, California
- Coordinates: 33°49′8.9″N 116°32′48.2″W
- Area: less than one acre
- Built: 1960
- Architect: E. Stewart Williams
- Architectural style: Modern Movement
- MPS: Architecture of E. Stewart Williams MPS
- NRHP reference No.: 16000892
- Added to NRHP: December 27, 2016

Santa Fe Federal Savings and Loan Association, also known as American Savings and the Palm Springs Art Museum Architecture & Design Center/Edwards Harris Pavilion, is a historic building located in Palm Springs, California. The building is a fine example of the short span of time that master architect E. Stewart Williams used the International Style of architecture for commercial buildings in the early 1960s. The inspiration for this building was the Barcelona Pavilion (1929) by Ludwig Mies van der Rohe. The single-story structure features a flat roof, deep overhangs, steel-frame construction, thin steel posts, and large glass surface areas. Full-height sliding perforated metal panels were used to control the sunshine into the interior. The building was listed on the National Register of Historic Places in 2016.
