= E. Stewart Williams =

American architect

Emerson Stewart Williams
- Born: November 15, 1909
- Died: September 10, 2005 (aged 95); Palm Springs, California, U.S.
- Resting place: Welwood Murray Cemetery, Palm Springs, California
- Education: Cornell University
- Occupation: Architect
- Buildings: Coachella Savings and Loan; Palm Springs Desert Museum

Emerson Stewart Williams, FAIA (November 15, 1909 – September 10, 2005) was a prolific Palm Springs, California-based architect whose distinctive modernist buildings, in the Mid-century modern style, significantly shaped the Coachella Valley's architectural landscape and legacy.

== Early life and education ==
Williams's father, Harry Williams, was an architect originally based in Dayton, Ohio best known for designing the offices of National Cash Register-NCR. In 1934, Julia Carnell, whose husband was the comptroller of NCR, decided that a commercial development in Palm Springs, California, where she wintered, would be a good investment and brought Harry Williams to Palm Springs to design the historic La Plaza Shopping Center. Harry Williams stayed on in the city afterward, opening his own architectural practice, which was later joined by E. Stewart's younger brother, Roger, also an architect.

Williams attended Cornell University, where he was elected to the Sphinx Head Society and graduated in 1932. He earned his Master of Architecture degree from the University of Pennsylvania in 1933.

== Career ==
After graduating from Cornell University, Williams then taught at Columbia University from 1934 to 1938. In 1938, Williams traveled through northern Europe, where he met a Swedish woman, who he married two years later after a prolonged separation due to the war. Upon returning, he worked in Raymond Loewy's office. In Loewy's office Williams' responsibilities included projects for the 1939 New York World's Fair, and the Lord and Taylor department store in Manhasset, Long Island in 1941, one of the first large suburban branches of a department store to be built.

In 1941, Williams began working in his father's Dayton, Ohio office on defense-related projects. By 1943, E. Stewart Williams was involved in the building of ships at the Bechtel Marin County facility in Sausalito, California, followed by a stint at Mare Island in the San Francisco Bay with the Navy.

A resident of Palm Springs, California, Williams had a Golden Palm Star on the Palm Springs Walk of Stars dedicated to him in 2008.

=== Palm Springs era ===
In 1946, Williams joined his father and brother in their Palm Springs practice, forming the 'Williams, Williams, & Williams' firm.

=== Sinatra residence ===
The 'Williams, Williams, & Williams' firm's first residential commission was a house for Frank Sinatra. Williams said that on May 1, 1947 Sinatra wandered into their office eating an ice cream cone and stating that he wanted a house built by Christmas, meaning Williams had roughly only three months to design it and another three months to build it. Sinatra's other requirement was that it be a Georgian-style mansion, a style neither aesthetically nor functionally suited to the desert.

Williams ended up presenting Sinatra two designs, one in the style he requested, and the other a low-lying, modern design, well integrated into the surrounding landscape and functionally appropriate to the climate. Luckily for all Sinatra chose the latter.

Though a relatively conservative design in comparison to the works of other notable modernist architects then designing and building in the area, particularly Richard Neutra and Albert Frey, the house would become an architectural trend-setter (being the first "shed roof" house in the desert) and serve as model of "hipness" in the desert community, thought this was perhaps as much due to its occupant as to its design. Roger Williams in a much later interview spoke about Sinatra's final choice of a modern design: "I'm so glad. We'd ['Williams, Williams, & Williams'] have been ruined if we'd been forced to build Georgian in the desert."

=== Other projects ===
What followed were an unbroken string of commissions, large and small, institutional and private, commercial and residential that made the practice of Williams, Williams, & Williams, and in particular E. Stewart Williams, one those most fecund practices and architects in the region. Williams' father died in 1957, and John Porter Clark joined the practice in the 1960s.

Among those significant commissions was one for a house for the Seattle hotel owners William and Marjorie Edris. Having purchased a large lot in Palm Springs, the Edris' commissioned Williams as both the architect and the contractor for the job. Williams' design was more sophisticated and integrated into its Colorado Desert habitat surroundings than the earlier Sinatra house.

The Edris House, as it is now known, remains largely unchanged, containing many of the original Williams' designed fixtures and details, and is protected from alteration since 2004 by being designated a Historic Building by the Palm Springs City Council. The home went up for sale in January 2017 with a list price of $4.2 million. At the time, then-owner J.R. Roberts said that the "house as it exists today is exactly how the house was in 1954."

== Death ==
Williams died on September 10, 2005, and is buried in Welwood Murray Cemetery in Palm Springs, California.

== Significant and modern buildings ==
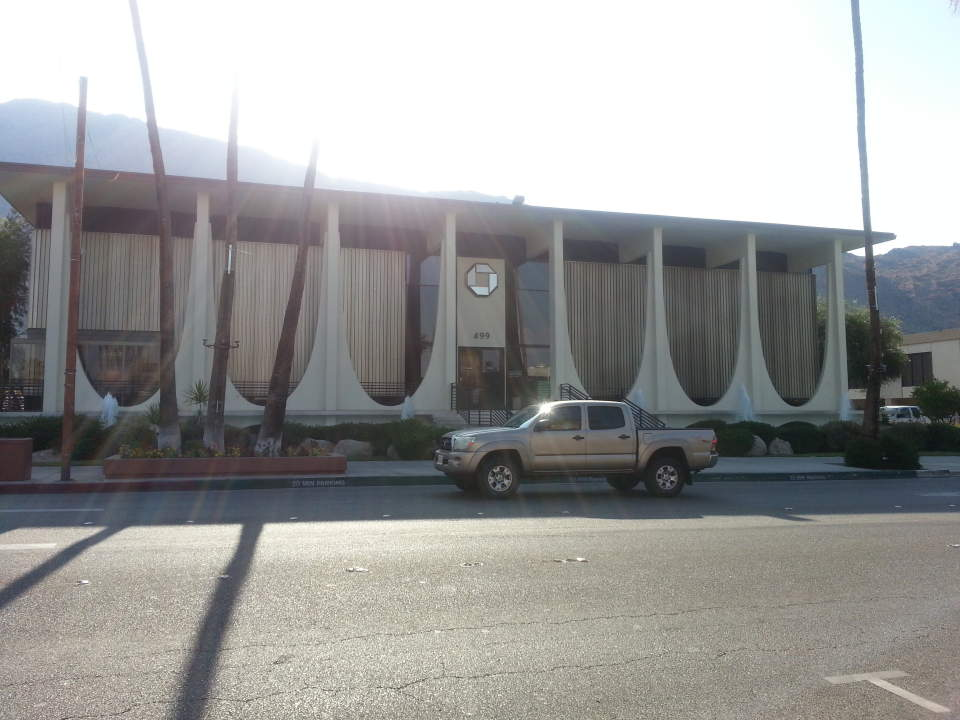
Coachella Valley Savings & Loan (1961)

- 1946 Potter Building - Palm Springs, California
- 1947 Sinatra House, "Twin Palms" - Palm Springs, California
- 1949 The Colony: a Studio Apartment group - Palm Springs, California
- 1950 Maceo House, Galveston, Texas.
- 1952 Oasis Building - Palm Springs, California
- 1952 Temple Isaiah - Palm Springs, California
- 1954 Edris House - Palm Springs, California
- 1955 Coachella Valley Savings No. 1 - Palm Springs, California
- 1955 Koerner House - Palm Springs, California
- 1956 Williams House - Palm Springs, California
- 1957 Kenaston House, - Rancho Mirage, California
- 1958 Sutter House - Palm Springs, California (Photography by Julius Shulman, 1960; original interiors by Arthur Elrod)
- 1960 Palm Springs Unified School District Educational Administrative Center - Palm Springs, California
- 1960 Santa Fe Federal Savings and Loan Association - Palm Springs, California
- 1961 Palm Springs Aerial Tramway Mountain Station, Mount San Jacinto State Park, above Palm Springs, California
- 1961 Coachella Valley Savings No. 2 - Palm Springs, California
- 1972 Crafton Hills College - Yucaipa, California
- 1976 Palm Springs Desert Museum - Palm Springs, California
- 1986 Erik and Sidney Williams House - Palm Springs, California
