= Rancho Mirage Amphitheater =

Rancho Mirage performance venue

- Interactive map of Rancho Mirage Amphitheater
- Address: Rancho Mirage Community Park, 71560 San Jacinto Drive; Rancho Mirage; United States
- Coordinates: 33.7464903145393°N 116.4146880055227°W
- Owner: City of Rancho Mirage
- Operator: City of Rancho Mirage Parks & Recreation
- Capacity: 600–1,000
- Type: Outdoor amphitheater

Construction
- Opened: 7 November 2015

Website
- https://ranchomirageamphitheater.org

Rancho Mirage Amphitheater is an outdoor performance venue located within Rancho Mirage Community Park in Rancho Mirage, California. The amphitheater hosts city-sponsored free concerts, seasonal community programming, theatrical productions, and performances by regional arts organizations. Entertainers at the venue have included Blue Öyster Cult, Rodney Atkins, Thompson Square, Pam Tillis, Pablo Cruise, Thelma Houston, Roberta Gambarini, Maxine Nightingale, Diane Schuur, and Mickey Thomas.

== History ==
The amphitheater was created as part of a mid-2010s expansion of the park (formerly Whitewater Park) and officially opened during the Rancho Mirage Art Affaire weekend on November 7, 2015. The opening weekend included music performances associated with the Art Affaire and a city ribbon-cutting.

Landscape-architecture and planning firms involved in the park expansion described the amphitheater as a terraced bowl with a covered platform stage sited to respond to mountain views and neighborhood context; the expansion increased publicly accessible park area.

== Facilities ==
Sources describe the venue as a covered stage with terraced/lawn seating and supporting backstage facilities. Visitor and tourism listings give the amphitheater a practical capacity range (commonly cited as several hundred up to approximately 1,000 depending on configuration). The amphitheater is integrated into the larger Community Park, which includes courts, playgrounds, fitness trails, and other recreation amenities.

== Programming and use ==
The amphitheater serves multiple programming roles:

- City-sponsored and free concerts — the City of Rancho Mirage promotes "Music in the Park" and other free outdoor concerts at the amphitheater as part of its parks & recreation programming.
- Desert Theatricals — Desert Theatricals produces Broadway-style dinner-theater and youth productions at the Rancho Mirage Amphitheater, with season pages and event listings describing seating, gate times, and onsite food & beverage service. These are often part of the programming presented by the Rancho Mirage Library and Observatory.
- Coachella Valley Symphony — the regional symphony has staged seasonal concerts (for example, its Halloween Spooktacular and other concert events supported by the City) at venues presented in partnership with local cities; event pages and promotional materials list performances and credit the City of Rancho Mirage among supporting partners.
- Other community and touring events — ticketing platforms, local event calendars, and arts reviewers document touring shows, tribute bands, local ensemble concerts, and theatrical runs at the amphitheater.

== Management and operations ==
The City of Rancho Mirage owns and operates Rancho Mirage Community Park and programs many free events; some ticketed productions and dinner-theater events are produced by independent organizations (for example, Desert Theatricals) under permit or contract with the City. Municipal press and local TV have also reported on routine park maintenance and periodic court upgrades affecting the Community Park complex.

== Notable events and reception ==
Local coverage of the amphitheater’s opening and subsequent programming has emphasized its role in expanding free cultural offerings and enabling outdoor dinner-theater productions and seasonal symphonic concerts.

== See also ==
- Rancho Mirage
- List of contemporary amphitheaters
