= Bruce Fessier =

American journalist

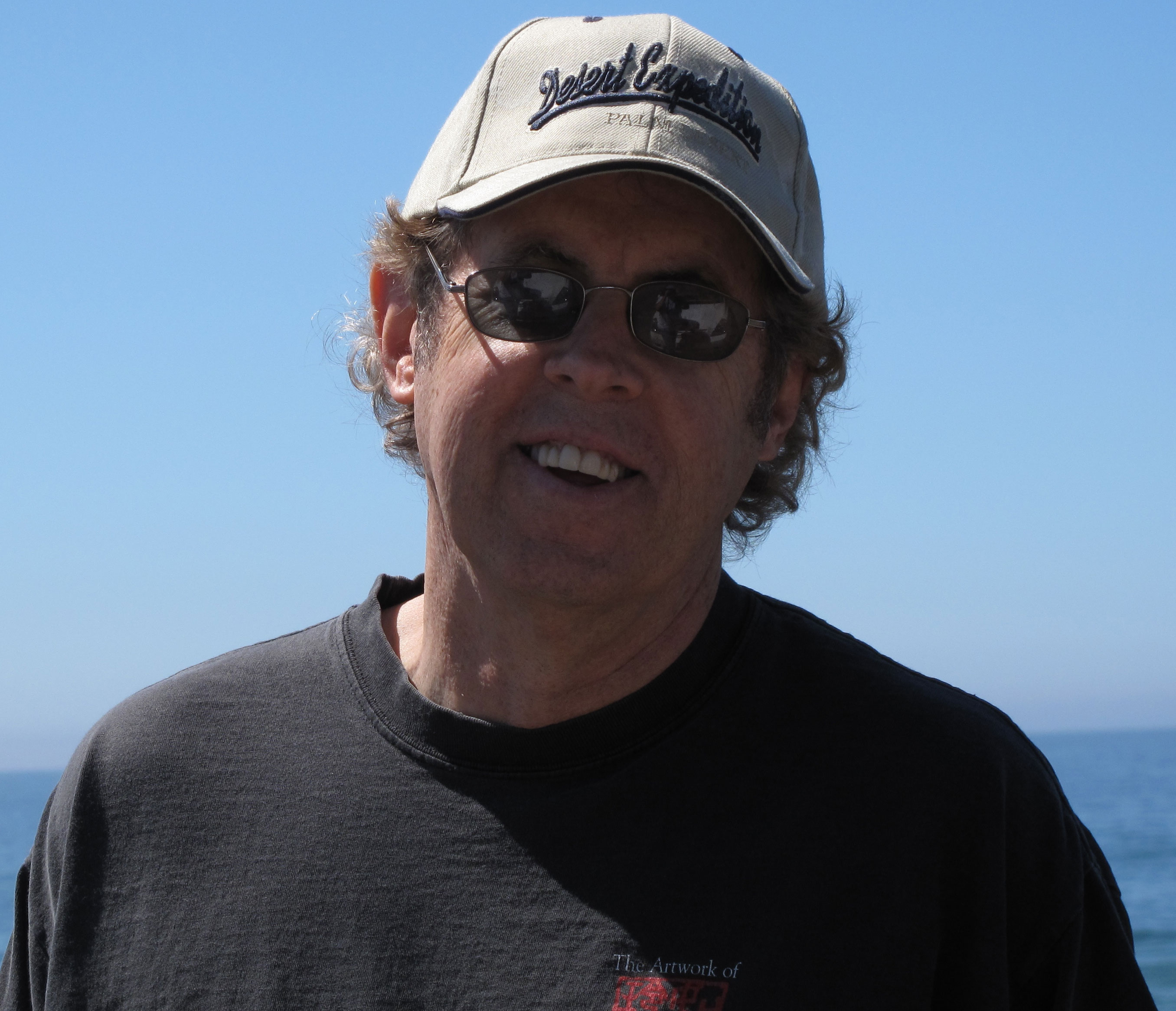
- Born: Los Angeles, California
- Occupation: Journalist
- Years active: 1971–2024
- Spouse: Jane Cannedy Fessier (m. 1984)
- Children: 2

Bruce Fessier is an American arts and entertainment journalist based in Rancho Mirage, California.

== Early life ==
Fessier was born in Los Angeles and raised in Whittier, California. He attended Whittier High School, alma mater of the 37th U.S. President, Richard Nixon, and was taught piano by Nixon’s cousin, Margaret Smith. He earned a journalism B.A. from San Francisco State University in 1975, placing second for enterprise reporting from the Society of Professional Journalists, Western U.S., for a story on Nixon’s “Road to Watergate.”

== Career ==
Fessier covered Southern California entertainment news for 44 years for two separately-owned "Desert" magazines, USA Today, Racquet Club Magazine, The Truth Seeker, Freedonia Gazette and more. He covered the 1978 California Jam II music festival in Ontario, Calif., and U.S. attempts to start a 1981 world expo in Ontario for The Herald-News of Fontana, Calif., 1977-78. He joined a Bloomington, Calif., Crime Prevention Commission after a riot in his neighborhood. His subsequent reporting of state Attorney General Evelle Younger’s pilot crime prevention program in an area identified by author Hunter Thompson as the home of the Hells Angels was called by local police, “an integral part of the successful effort to reduce crime within the greater Fontana area.” The United Way honored him for community service in January 1979.

Fessier wrote a people and entertainment column, plus news and feature stories for The Desert Sun in Palm Springs from 1979- 2019. He left the paper after 40 years to pursue writing and speaking opportunities. His Desert Sun career was celebrated with a State of California Assembly resolution, a CV Music lifetime achievement in journalism award sponsored by the Coachella Valley Weekly newspaper, and an endowment in his name from the College of the Desert Foundation to pay for Desert Sun internships. He continues to raise funds for that cause.

Fessier has covered every Coachella Valley Music and Arts Festival, Stagecoach country music festival and Palm Springs International Film Festival, plus the first US Festival in San Bernardino, Calif. His awards include Best News Reporting, AP, California-Arizona 2005 for his stories on Ronald Reagan’s death; Best Writing, California Newspaper Publisher Association 2018 for his story on the death of Sonny Bono; and Best Video, Gannett 2015 for his history of the Mafia in Palm Springs. He updated that story for a two-part Coachella Valley Weekly series in January 2023 titled “The Flip Side of Utopia,” including new perspectives on the forced removal of minority occupants from Palm Springs’ Section 14 and the Agua Caliente Band of Cahuilla Indians conservatorship program. He also was interviewed by director Tom Donahue that month about Chicago mobsters Johnny Roselli and Sam Giancana for a projected Paramount Plus docuseries, “Mafia Spies,” based on the 2019 book by Thomas Maier.

He was roasted by a panel including Bono and jazz artist Georgie Auld in 1987 to raise funds for the Desert Theatre League, which he co-founded with actor Steve Meek. He served on Bono’s founding Palm Springs International Film Festival committee in 1987 and co-founded the Jazz Celebrity Golf & JAMS Session in 1997 with his wife Jane Fessier and singer Frankie Randall. He researched the 2006 touring Global Inheritance exhibition, “Portal Potties,” debuting at the 2006 Coachella, to showcase the pop culture of each decade of the 20th century. He co-wrote the title track to Pat Rizzo's 2011 LP, It’s Not You, It’s We.

Fessier covered Frank Sinatra's home life and the Coachella Valley underground music scene from which Queens of the Stone Age emerged. He appears in Leo Zahn’s 2018 documentary, Sinatra in Palm Springs and Joerg Steineck’s 2015 documentary, Lo Desert Sound. He co-founded a Desert Rock at the IPAC series with Mario Lalli that evolved into Tachevah: A Palm Springs Block Party, produced by The Desert Sun, Goldenvoice, the Agua Caliente Band of Cahuilla Indians, P.S. Resorts and Harold Matzner in 2015.

He taught classes on “Elvis Presley in Palm Springs” for UC Riverside Palm Desert in 2007 and “The History & Legends of the Joshua Tree Music Scene” for Desert Institute at Joshua Tree National Park in 2019. He lectured on "Palm Springs: From the Rat Pack to Coachella" for the Palm Springs Historical Society in 2019 and chronicled a longer history of the Palm Springs music scene in a 2022 program for the Oasis Music Festival, published by Palm Springs Life. He reported the 20-year history of Coachella for The Desert Sun and Empire Polo Club magazine.

Fessier hosted and produced the last tribute to Merv Griffin in 2007 to benefit the La Quinta Arts Foundation. In 2022, Fessier produced the benefit “Pet Love and Rock & Roll” September 17 in the Palm Springs Art Museum featuring a concert by former Kyuss lead singer John Garcia and Songwriters Hall of Famer Billy Steinberg to help Amy’s Purpose’s put more veterinary workers in the field in the Coachella Valley. He was honored as an Amy’s Purpose “champion” at a mixer to raise funds for Amy’s Purpose March 1, 2023 at Willie’s Modern Faire Restaurant & Lounge in Rancho Mirage.

He was inducted into the inaugural class of the Coachella Valley Media Hall of Fame by the Coachella Valley Journalism Foundation on Feb. 28, 2024 at a luncheon at Thunderbird Country Club in Rancho Mirage.
