= Children's Discovery Museum of the Desert =

Children's museum in Rancho Mirage, California

- Established: 1998
- Location: 71701 Gerald Ford Drive, Rancho Mirage, California
- Coordinates: 33°47′12″N 116°24′39″W
- Type: Children's museum
- Director: Cindy Burreson (chief executive officer)
- Website: cdmod.org

Children's Discovery Museum of the Desert (CDMoD) is a non-profit children's museum in Rancho Mirage, California, serving the Coachella Valley. Opened in 1998, the three-building campus offers hands-on exhibits and programs emphasizing creative play, science, arts, and the desert environment. After being closed during the COVID-19 pandemic, the museum completed the first phase of a multi-year “Re-Imagination” and reopened to the public on May 24, 2024.

== History ==
Local parents and educators formed the museum in the 1990s, opening CDMoD in 1998. The campus was purpose-built for interactive exhibits, with the original galleries designed in collaboration with Hands On! Studios; a second building was added in 2011. The architecture has been noted for its family-friendly planning and indoor–outdoor circulation appropriate to the desert climate.

CDMoD closed in March 2020 amid the COVID-19 pandemic. During the closure, the board developed a five-phase “Re-Imagination” plan to refresh galleries, expand capacity, and improve accessibility. By early 2024, fundraising and planning enabled a phased reopening, with the public return occurring on May 24, 2024, before a broader schedule and programming expansion later in the year.

== Facilities and exhibits ==
Phase One of the Re-Imagination refreshed the Main Gallery (Building One), focusing on children ages 0–8 across six thematic areas—“Imagine,” “Express,” “Move,” “Experiment,” “Explore,” and “Dream”—with nearly 40 newly built or refurbished exhibits by Hands On! Studios. Building Two continues to host rotating role-play and STEAM activities (e.g., market and kitchen play, a veterinary clinic, block-building), with additional updates planned as part of later phases.

== Programs and accessibility ==
Upon reopening, CDMoD became a Certified Autism Center, following staff training in sensory awareness and the introduction of sensory bags, posted sensory guides for exhibits, and a dedicated quiet room. The museum also reinstated regular family classes and parent engagement sessions and expanded seasonal community events following the 2024 reopening.

== Governance and finance ==
CDMoD operates as an independent non-profit organization led by a board of directors; the chief executive officer is Cindy Burreson. Public filings identify the organization as a 501(c)(3). Local media reported more than $2 million in capital fundraising and a line of credit supporting the reopening and early phases of the re-imagination.

== Recognition ==
In 2024, readers of the Coachella Valley Independent named CDMoD the “Best Indoor Activity for Kids,” following the museum’s return from its pandemic closure.

== See also ==
- List of museums in California
- Children's museum
