= Rancho Mirage, California =

- City
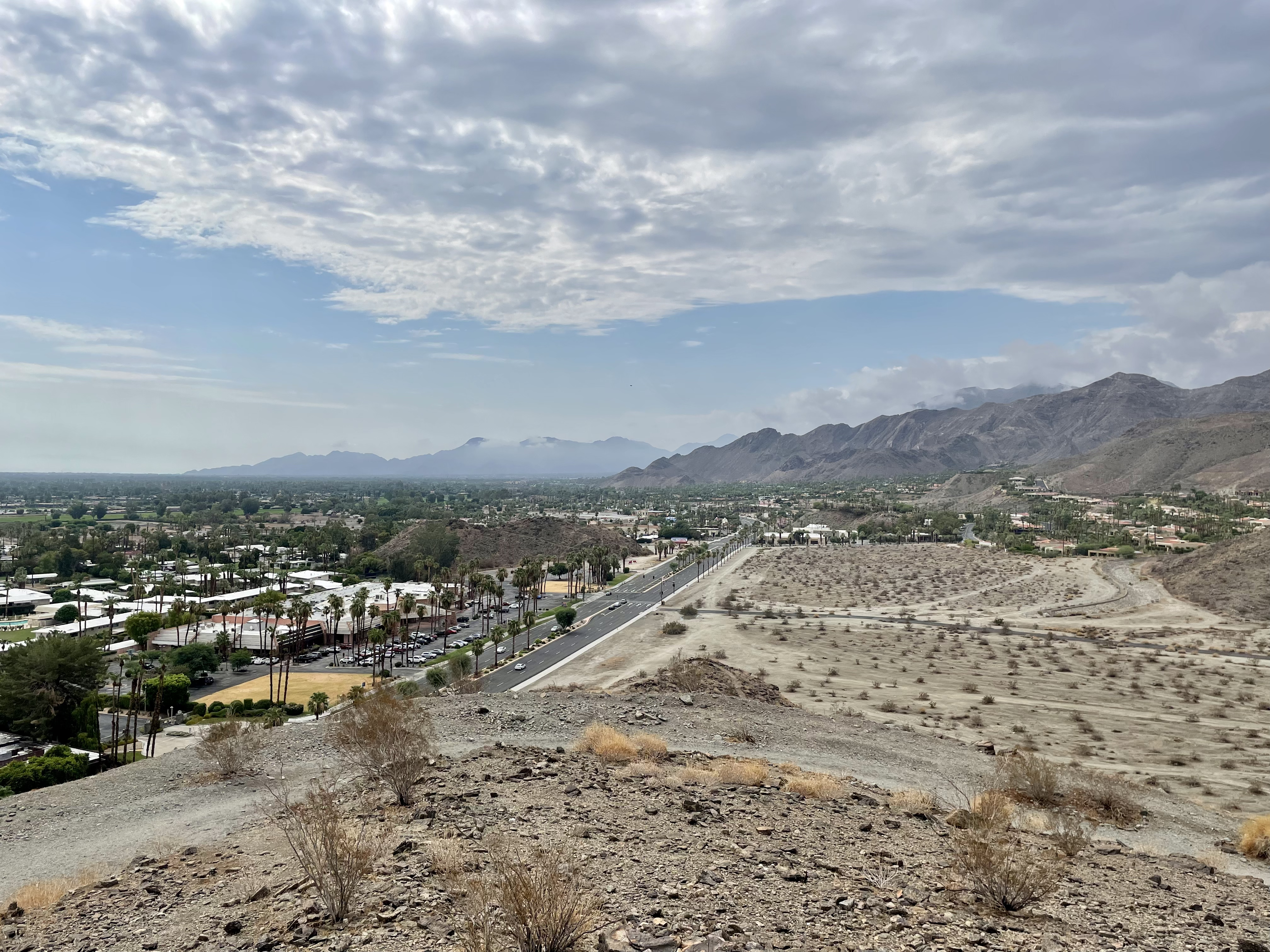
- California State Route 111 in Rancho Mirage

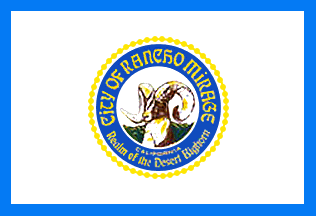
- Flag
- Interactive map of Rancho Mirage, California
- Location in the United States
- Coordinates: 33°46′9″N 116°25′16″W
- Country: United States
- State: California
- County: Riverside
- Native American Reservation (partial): Agua Caliente Band of Cahuilla Indians
- Incorporated: August 3, 1973

Government
  - Type: Council–Manager
  - Mayor: Lynn Mallotto
  - Mayor Pro Tem: Michael O'Keefe
  - City Council: Eve Fromberg Edelstein; Steve Downs; Ted Weill
  - City Manager: Isaiah Hagerman

Area
  - Total: 25.74 sq mi (66.67 km^{2})
  - Land: 25.35 sq mi (65.66 km^{2})
  - Water: 0.39 sq mi (1.01 km^{2}) 1.51%
- Elevation: 272 ft (83 m)

Population (2020)
  - Total: 16,999
  - Estimate (2024): 18,001
  - Density: 671/sq mi (258.9/km^{2})
- Time zone: UTC-8 (Pacific)
  - Summer (DST): UTC-7 (PDT)
- ZIP code: 92270
- Area codes: 442/760
- FIPS code: 06-59500
- GNIS feature IDs: 1661281, 2411515
- Website: ranchomirageca.gov

Rancho Mirage is a city in Riverside County, California, United States. The city is a low-density desert community with resorts, golf courses, and country clubs within the Colorado Desert section of the Sonoran Desert. Nestled along the foothills of the Santa Rosa Mountains in the south, it is located about ten miles southeast of Palm Springs. The city is adjacent to Cathedral City, Palm Desert, and unincorporated Thousand Palms. The population was 16,999 at the 2020 census, down from 17,218 at the 2010 census, though the seasonal population can exceed 20,000. Incorporated in 1973, Rancho Mirage is one of the nine cities of the Coachella Valley.

The city has been nicknamed "Playground of the Presidents" and "Golf Capital of the World". The city has hosted and currently hosts a variety of golf and tennis tournaments, including the Ryder Cup, Desert Classic (PGA Tour), Davis Cup, and the LPGA Tour (Chevron Championship).

== History ==
Native Americans came to the area 2,000 years ago. The local tribe in Rancho Mirage is the Agua Caliente Indian tribe of Cahuilla Indians. The tribe was almost annihilated by smallpox in 1862–63 but survived, today establishing a resort and casino within the modern city limits. An ancient Native-American trade route, the Halchidhoma trade route, follows the water holes and water springs along the foothills of the Santa Rosa Mountains. A segment of this trail is now part of California State Route 111 in Rancho Mirage. The trade route originally reached from the Pacific Ocean in the west to central Arizona, and was used for centuries for trading, food, and for religious purposes. About 1,000 years ago, the local Cahuilla tribes were introduced to pottery from Native American tribes by the Colorado River. The Spaniards also knew of the Coco-Mariposa Trail in the 1820s when they would send letters by Cahuilla runners along the trail to the mission in Tucson, Arizona. The natural environment in Rancho Mirage has supplied the Cahuilla people with various water sources. Although rare in such arid desert environments, the Cahuilla had access to Magnesia Spring in Magnesia Spring Canyon, which is 1.5 miles (2.4 km) from Whitewater River. In addition, a variety of natural springs are situated along the San Andreas Fault line near Indio Hills.

Throughout the 1920s, the area was open desert dotted with date and grape ranches. In 1928, 160 acres (65 ha) here were purchased by the Southland Land and Realty Company. Access was planned by camel on roads given North-African names, including Tunis Road, Tangier Road, and Sahara Road. The 1929 Depression put an end to the plans. A few years later, a Los Angeles realtor, Lawrence Macomber, purchased hundreds of acres here. Along with Don Cameron, the two began offering property here advertised as "fifteen minutes from Palm Springs, CA." They were able to attract actor Frank Morgan, among others, until the onset of World War II brought development to an end once again. In 1944, hundreds of acres were bought by Major A. Ronald Button. He described it as "the most wind free area I could find in the desert." Two years later, in 1946, Henry L. Gogerty established an airstrip here and later launched the Desert Air Hotel and Airpark.

The Annenberg Estate or 'Sunnylands', owned by philanthropists Walter and Leonore Annenberg, was popular with the wealthy and powerful, including Frank Sinatra, Bob Hope, Fred Astaire, Ginger Rogers, Patrick Macnee, Zeppo Marx and Mary Martin. Several U.S. Presidents vacationed at the Annenberg estate, including Richard Nixon, Ronald Reagan, Gerald Ford, and Barack Obama. President Ford later purchased a house in Rancho Mirage and was living there at the time of his death in 2006. The Betty Ford Center, an addiction rehabilitation center, is located in Rancho Mirage at the Eisenhower Medical Center. President Obama also used Sunnylands for summit meetings with world leaders during his administration.

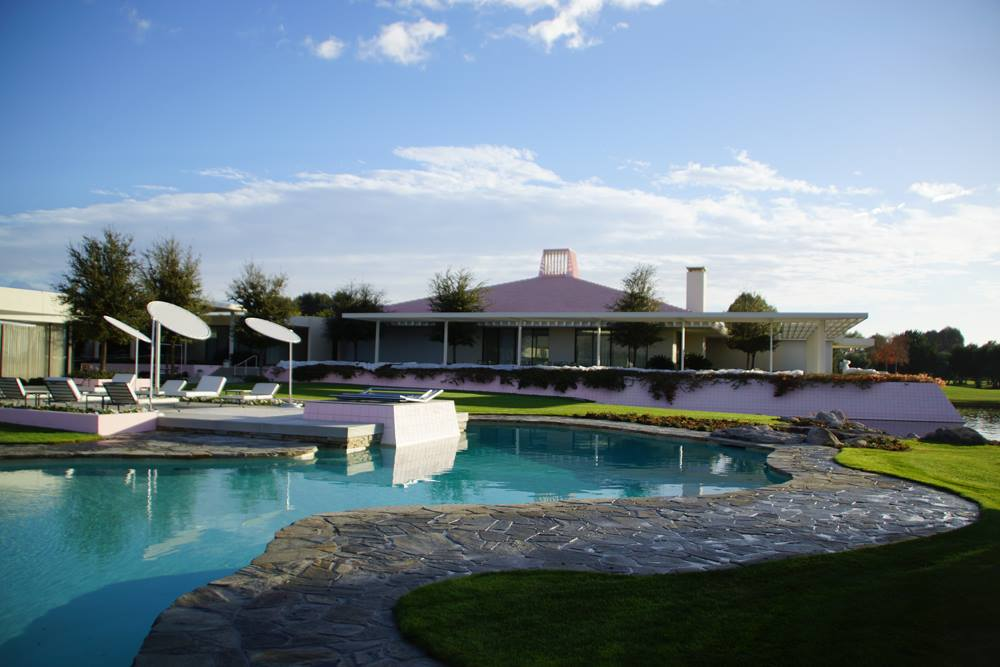
Sunnylands

Some of the first places of accommodation to be established were the White Sun Guest Ranch and Wonder Palms Ranch, and later Desert Air Hotel and Thunderbird Ranch in the 1940s. The 320-acre (130 ha) Desert Air Hotel was purchased by the Rancho Las Palmas Country Club in the 1970s. Rancho Las Palmas has Spanish architecture consisting of wood walls, Saltillo tiles, and high ceilings. The resort, which is the city's third-largest employer, is located on a 249-acre (101 ha) property in the center of Rancho Mirage, across Bob Hope Drive from The River, an outdoor shopping center. It has a 27-hole golf course.

Thunderbird Ranch, which opened in 1946, was purchased by Johnny Dawson, who established Coachella Valley's first 18-hole golf course. Thunderbird Country Club was established in 1950, and the golf cart or electric golf cart is rumored to have been invented at Thunderbird. Ford Thunderbird is also named for the country club. Tamarisk Country Club soon followed in the 1950s, and later an array of country clubs were established in the city: Desert Island Golf and Country Club in 1971, Sunrise Country Club in 1974, The Springs Country Club in 1975, Mission Hills Country Club in 1979, the Club at Morningside (1982), Rancho Mirage Country Club (1985), and Westin Mission Hills Resort and Spa (1987). Rancho Mirage was incorporated in 1973 from a merger of five unincorporated areas known as the "Cove communities" (Rancho Mirage, Desert, Palmas, Tamarisk, and Thunderbird), and had 3,000 permanent residents at the time.

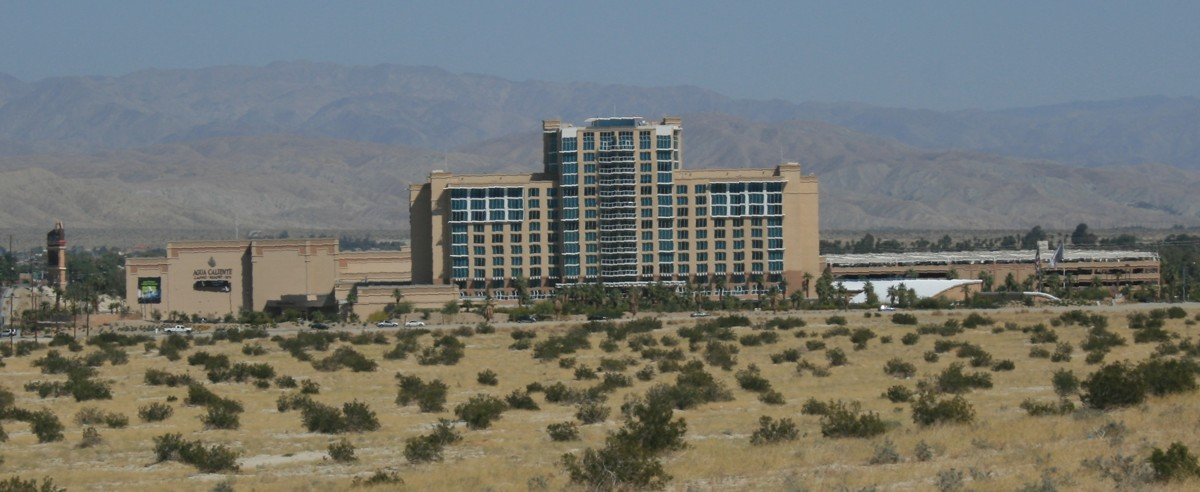
Agua Caliente Casino Resort Spa is the only skyscraper in the Coachella Valley.

In 2001, the Agua Caliente Band of Cahuilla Indians established the Agua Caliente Casino on the intersection of Bob Hope Drive and Ramon Road off Interstate 10. It was the second casino to be built in the Coachella Valley. The casino is a popular destination for locals, tourists, and gambling enthusiasts. In 2008 the tribal board completed the expansion of the Agua Caliente resort, which includes a 16-story hotel and spa, as well as remodeling the casino and expanding the parking structures. A theater for top-name entertainers opened in 2009. Though the Agua Caliente Resort and Casino was just outside the border of Rancho Mirage in an unincorporated area, the City of Rancho Mirage included the property as part of the city in an agreement with the tribe so they would have access to police and firefighting services.

A new residential development for senior citizens by Pulte Homes, Inc., known as Del Webb Rancho Mirage, will open in the year 2020. It is the third local development by the company after Sun City Palm Desert and Sun City Shadow Hills in Indio.

In March 2021, it was announced that Rancho Mirage would be the site of first US neighborhood composed completely of 3D-printed, zero net energy homes. The project is a joint effort from companies Palari and Mighty Buildings. It will comprise 15 homes, and are expected to be completed by 2022.

In February 2022, The Walt Disney Company announced that Rancho Mirage will be the location of its first Storyliving by Disney community. Named Cotino, the community will be developed in collaboration with DMB Development of Scottsdale, Arizona.

=== Etymology ===
The name is both Spanish ("Rancho") and French ("Mirage"). One story of the name's origin relates to a woman of the name Ruth Wheeler who visited Magnesia Falls Canyon and named the ranch she saw in a distance a mirage. The area adopted the name Rancho Mirage in 1934. The City of Rancho Mirage was incorporated under the same name on August 3, 1973.

=== Presidential history ===
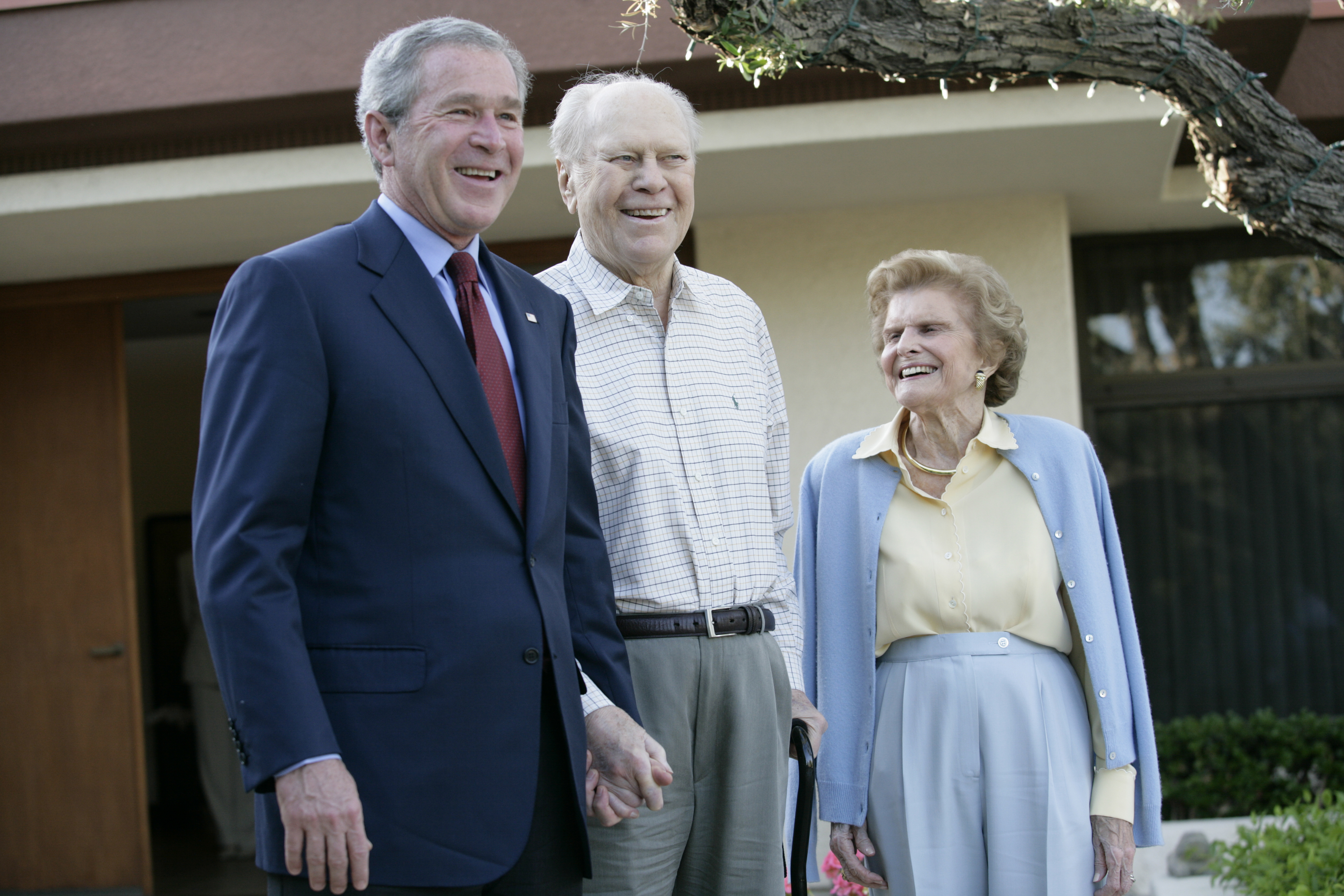
President George W. Bush greeting the media in Rancho Mirage with President Gerald Ford and Betty Ford

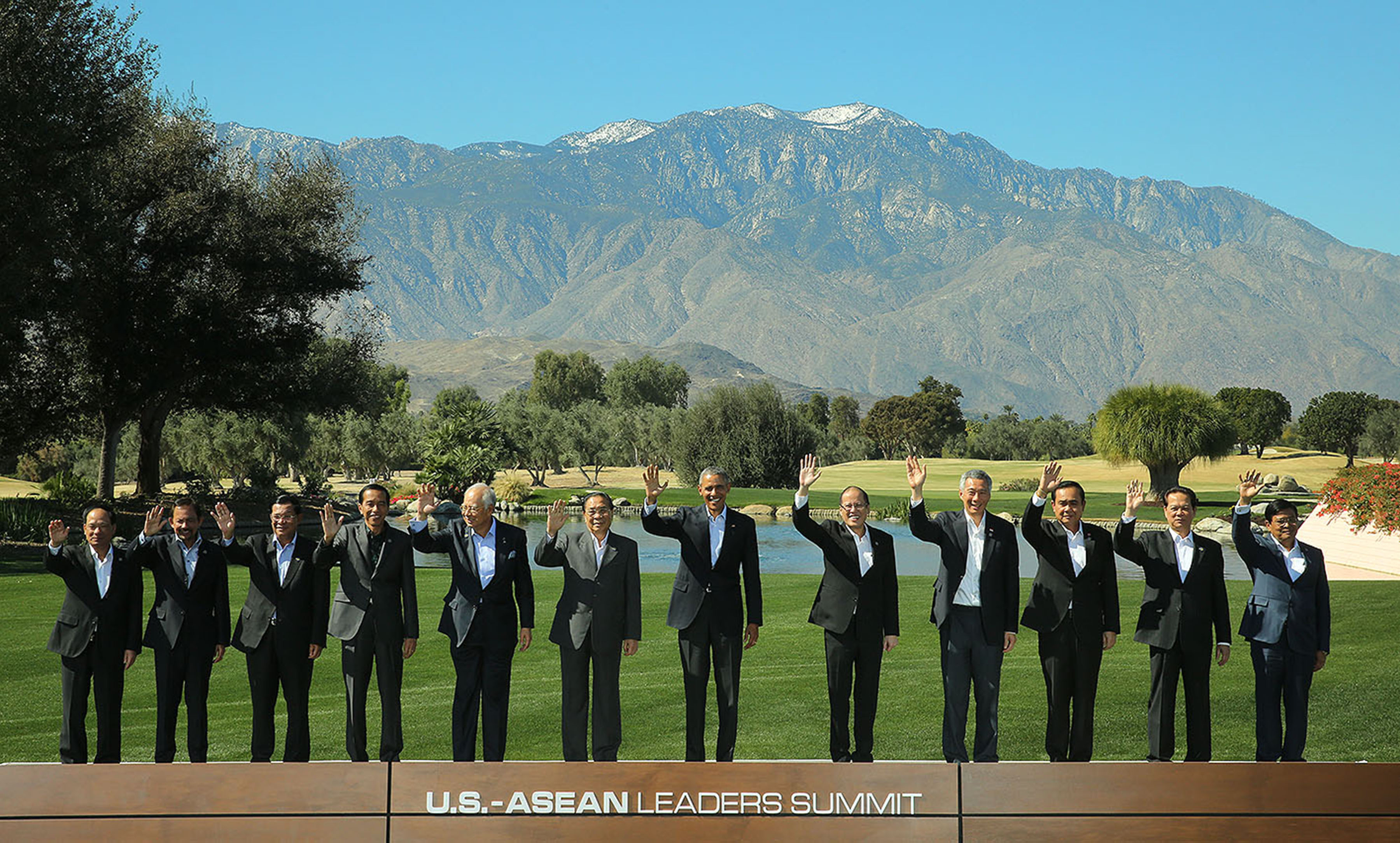
President Barack Obama at the 2016 US-ASEAN Summit in Rancho Mirage

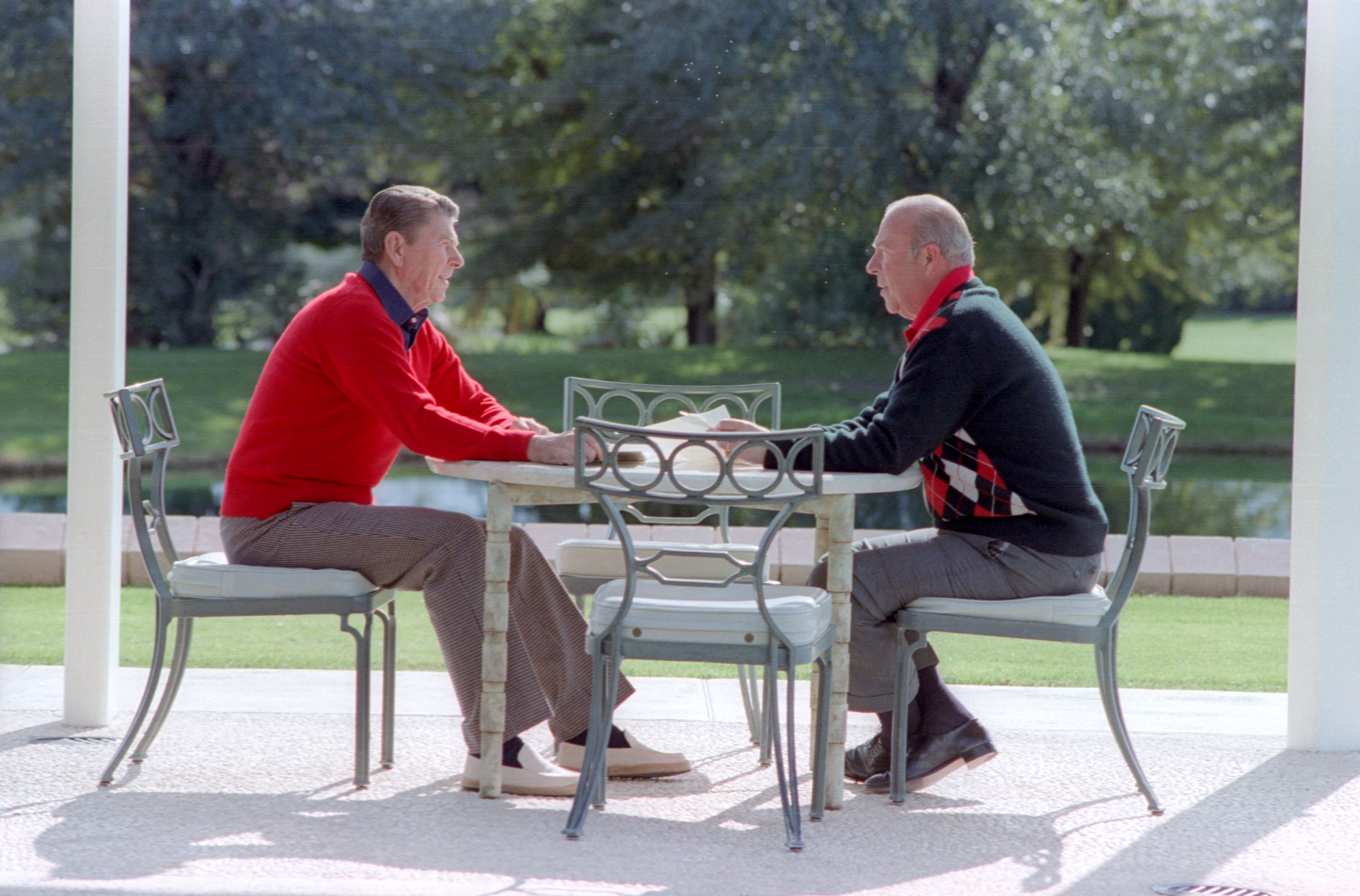
President Reagan meeting with Secretary of State George Shultz at the Annenberg Estate

Rancho Mirage has been nicknamed the "Playground of the Presidents" due to its extensive history of U.S. presidents residing in and visiting the city. For example, President Harry Truman regularly visited the Tamarisk Country Club, while President Dwight D. Eisenhower lived nearby. President Gerald Ford and First Lady Betty Ford were residents of Rancho Mirage for thirty years. The Fords moved to Thunderbird Country Club after leaving office.

Walter and Leonore Annenberg's estate, Sunnylands, became known as the western White House during the Richard Nixon administration in the 1960s. At the time, the estate also became the biggest single-family home in the county. President Dwight D. Eisenhower also stayed here and President Richard Nixon wrote his last State of the Union here. President Ronald Reagan was also a regular visitor at Sunnylands and Presidents Gerald Ford, Jimmy Carter, Bill Clinton, and George W. Bush have all been visitors here. While President George H. W. Bush had an official summit here with Japanese Prime Minister Toshiki Kaifu in 1990, Queen Elizabeth II of Britain visited in 1980. President Barack Obama spent two days here in 2013 where he visited with General Secretary of the Chinese Communist Party Xi Jinping. President Obama then became the eighth U.S. president to visit Sunnylands. President Ronald Reagan attended eighteen New Year's Eve celebrations in Rancho Mirage, including every year during the Reagan Administration.

President George H. W. Bush played golf with Bill Clinton in Rancho Mirage throughout the 1990s. President Richard Nixon went to Rancho Mirage a month prior to announcing his resignation from office. Nixon signed the Sunnylands' guestbook on the day he was issued a full pardon from President Ford. Thunderbird Country Club has hosted presidents such as John F. Kennedy, Lyndon B. Johnson, Richard Nixon, Gerald Ford, George H.W. Bush, and Dwight D. Eisenhower. President Barack Obama visited the country club on Presidents Day in 2020. President Obama hosted three world summits in Rancho Mirage during his presidency. He hosted the first-ever U.S. summit with the Association of Southeast Asian Nations (ASEAN) in Rancho Mirage on February 15–16, 2016. He also hosted King Abdullah II of Jordan here in 2014.

President Donald Trump visited a fundraising event at Porcupine Creek in Rancho Mirage in February 2020.

President Gerald Ford died on December 26, 2006, at his home in Rancho Mirage. His first funeral service took place in the city days before those first in Washington, D.C., on January 2, 2007, and then in Grand Rapids on January 4 that same year. First Lady Betty Ford died on July 8, 2011, in Rancho Mirage.

== Geography ==
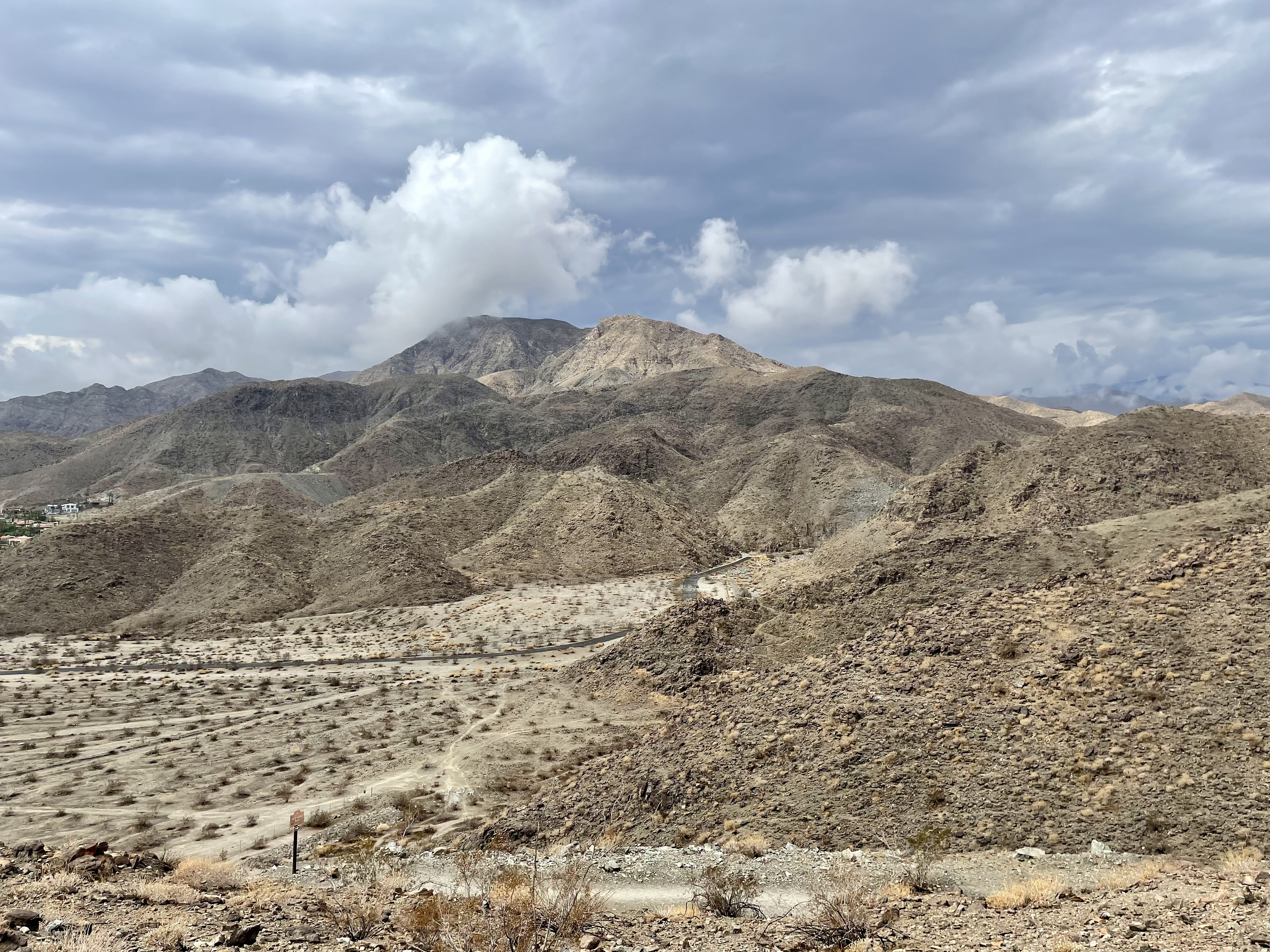
Santa Rosa Mountains from Bighorn Overlook

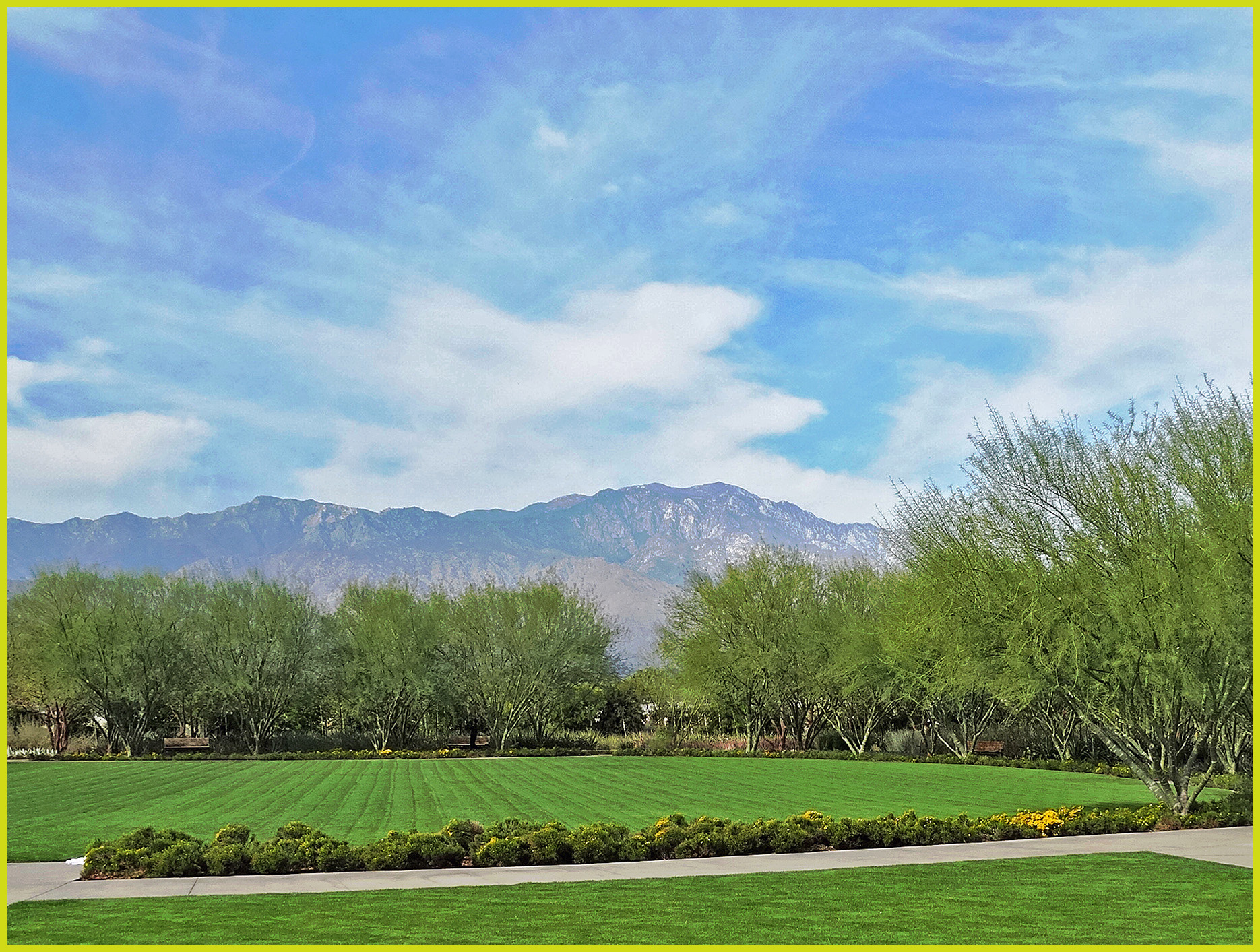
San Jacinto Mountains from Sunnylands

According to the United States Census Bureau, the city has a total area of 25.7 square miles (67 km^{2}), of which 25.4 square miles (66 km^{2}) is land and 0.4 square miles (1.0 km^{2}), or 1.51%, is water, including the 10-story Desert Island Hotel-Golf Resort built on an island surrounded by a 25-acre artificial lake.

Whitewater River (Agua Blanco), a perennial stream, flows through the city in a southeasterly direction before discharging into the Salton Sea. Another creek, the Magnesia Spring Creek, is located in Magnesia Spring Canyon where the 40 ft. tall waterfall Magnesia Falls also is found. A flood along Magnesia Spring Creek's alluvial fan in 1979 led to one death and $7 million in damages. Concrete-lined spillways have since been installed by the U.S. Army Corps of Engineers. Earthquakes are also somewhat common, and on July 8, 1986, an earthquake led to the destruction of 20 buildings and homes, along with big damages to roads and other structures.

A number of street names are named for celebrities, entertainers, and presidents who resided in the city, including Gerald Ford Drive, Ginger Rogers Road, Frank Sinatra Drive (formerly Wonder Palms Road), Bob Hope Drive (formerly Rio del Sol), Kaye Ballard Lane, Danny Kaye Road, Dinah Shore Drive, Dean Martin Drive, and Bing Crosby Drive. Bing Crosby established the Blue Skies Village Mobile Home Park in 1953 and named its streets after celebrities such as Burns and Allen, Jack Benny, Greer Garson, Claudette Colbert, and Barbara Stanwyck.

A stretch of California State Route 111 in Rancho Mirage has earned the moniker "Restaurant Row" as there are over thirty eateries located between Bob Hope Drive and Frank Sinatra Drive. A number of these are located at the River at Rancho Mirage, a 30-acre outdoor shopping center. The area surrounding The River is also known as Downtown Rancho Mirage. On a per-capita basis, the city is home to one eatery for every 240 residents, making it the city in the Coachella Valley with the most restaurants per capita.

=== Ecology ===
==== Flora ====
The native flora is characterized by cacti and shrubs. Creosote bush, Bur sage, Palo verde, Desert willow, Cat's claw, Mesquite, Screwbean, and Brittle bush are some naturally occurring plant species. The California fan palm, which is the only palm tree native to the region, is found in areas of freshwater sources, including by Magnesia Spring Creek and Whitewater River.

Over 1,000 wild plant species are found in the Coachella Valley. Besides desert flowers, cacti, and palm trees, there are ephemeral flowers, ferns, vines, and shrubs. The vast majority of these species are able to live through extended periods of non to little precipitation, including local cacti species as the California barrel cactus, which is the biggest of the 20 native species of cacti in the Coachella Valley. Several of the local desert species are edible, including cactus fruits from the Beaver tail cactus, California barrel cactus, and the Prickly pear cacti. Fruits and flowers from several Yucca species are also edible, as well as the seed pods and blossoms of the Mesquite. Some local species are poisonous, including Jimsonweed and Locoweed. Springs and streams are home to species such as the California fan palm, which is North America's largest palm species, along with other common tree species in oasis environments such as the Willow, Fremont's cottonwood, California sycamore, Honey-pod mesquite, and White alder. Other species include the Smoke tree, Palo verde, Ironwood, Desert willow, Stream orchid, Creosote bush, Burrobush, Brittlebush, Sand verbena, Desert primrose, and Desert sunflower.

==== Fauna ====
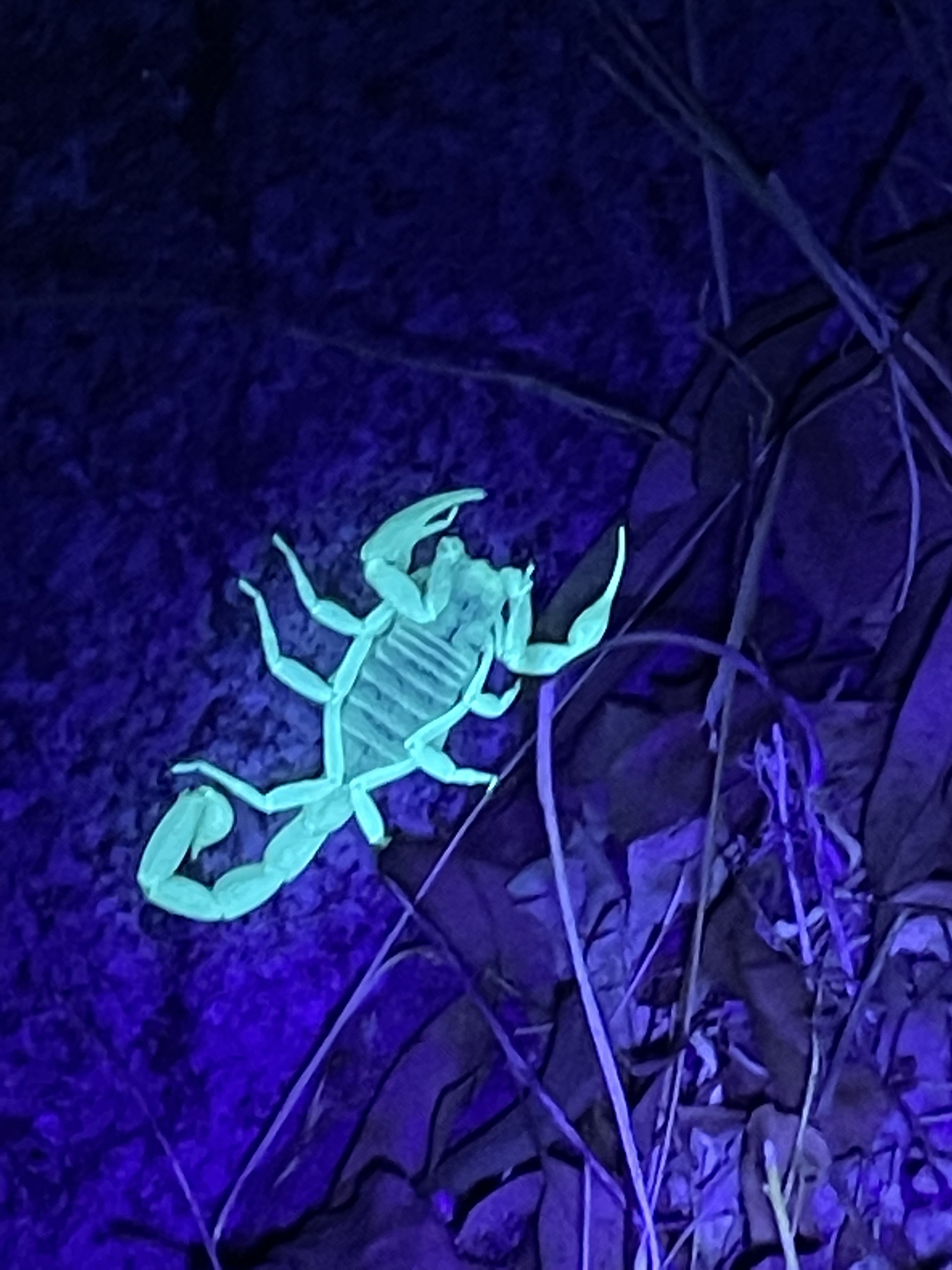

The fauna consists of over 20 species of mammals. Some native carnivores include the Gray fox, Coyote, Ringtail cat, Bobcat, and the Desert Kit Fox. Other species include the Southwestern Willow Flycatcher, Bell's Vireo, Prairie Falcon, and the Peninsular Bighorn Sheep. Another notable species of wildlife is the endemic Coachella Valley fringe-toed lizard. The Sonoran Desert has eleven species of rattlesnakes - more than anywhere else in the world. Other notable species include the Gila monster, Chuckwalla, Horned lizard, Desert iguana, Vulture, Desert tortoise, Scorpion, and Javelina. Black bears are rare, however, they inhabit the surrounding mountains and have been sighted on numerous occasions. Four species of Scorpion are found in the Coachella Valley, none of which are considered dangerous to humans. The most common species is the Dune scorpion or Desert sand scorpion (Paruroctonus mesaensis) but the valley is also home to the Giant hairy scorpion (Hadrurus arizonensis), which is the largest species of scorpion in the United States.

Rancho Mirage has adopted the Peninsular Bighorn Sheep as its "community icon" and its official city symbol. The city has also adopted a bighorn ram as its official city logo. The Peninsular Bighorn Sheep has been on the U.S. federal list of endangered species since 1998 (or 2004). In 2002, the city invested $1.2 million in constructing a 3.5-mile fence to separate the rams from civilization. The 8-ft. mesh fence was installed between the California State Route 111 and the peaks of the Santa Rosa Mountains. When the city was incorporated in 1973, 1,200 sheep lived in the Peninsular Ranges which consist of the San Jacinto and Santa Rosa Mountains. By 1995, the number of sheep was 276 but reached 400 in 2002.

The fauna consists of species adapted to desert, temperature extremes, and to lack of moisture. 450 vertebrate species have been recorded in the Coachella Valley including 347 species of birds, 58 species of mammals, 40 species of reptiles, and eight species of amphibians. The largest native mammal, the Bighorn sheep, can reach 200 pounds in weight. Large predators include the Bobcat, Mountain lion, Kit fox, Ring-tailed cat, Coyote, and Gray fox. Some other species include the Antelope ground squirrel, Roadrunners, Side-blotched lizard, and several species of scorpions, centipedes, and rattlesnakes. Some bird species, including the White-crowned sparrow and Ruby-crowned kinglet, spend winters in the Coachella Valley before flying to colder climates during the hot summer months. The Coachella Valley is home to four endangered or threatened species, including the Desert pupfish, Desert tortoise, Desert slender salamander, and the Coachella Valley fringe-toed lizard. Threatened or endangered species in Rancho Mirage include the Peninsular Bighorn sheep, Fringe-toed lizard, Desert tortoise, Southwestern willow flycatcher, Desert slender salamander, Peregrine falcon, and Least Bell's vireo.

=== Climate ===
Rancho Mirage's climate is a hot desert climate, with hot and dry summers, often with temperatures reaching 120 °F (49 °C). Winters are short and mild, with chances of night frost occurring only in December and January. Annual precipitation ranges between 3.5–5.5 inches (89–140 mm) and is often the result of winter rainstorms. Rancho Mirage is one of nine cities situated in the Coachella Valley, a 55-mile-long (89 km) valley that is an extension of the Sonoran Desert to the southeast. It is located in the Colorado Desert, a name used for the California section of the Sonoran Desert. Climatically, Rancho Mirage is dominated by hot temperatures and precipitation that averages less than ten inches a year. Even in the coldest month, January, temperatures below 40 °F (4 °C) are rare.

The climate of the Coachella Valley is influenced by the surrounding geography. High mountain ranges on three sides and a south-sloping valley floor all contribute to its unique and year-round warm climate, with the warmest winters in the western United States. Rancho Mirage has an arid climate; its average annual high temperature is 87 °F (31 °C) and average annual low is 63 °F (17 °C) but summer highs above 108 °F (42 °C) are common and sometimes exceed 120 °F (49 °C), while summer night lows often stay above 82 °F (28 °C). Winters are warm with daytime highs between 73–84 °F (23–29 °C). Under 5 inches (130 mm) of annual precipitation are average, with over 350 days of sunshine per year.

Climate data for Boyd Deep Canyon Campground (1982–2012)
Month	Jan	Feb	Mar	Apr	May	Jun	Jul	Aug	Sep	Oct	Nov	Dec	Year
Mean daily maximum °F (°C)	69.8 (21.0)	72.1 (22.3)	78.6 (25.9)	85.3 (29.6)	93.4 (34.1)	101.7 (38.7)	105.6 (40.9)	104.5 (40.3)	99.5 (37.5)	89.4 (31.9)	77.4 (25.2)	68.2 (20.1)	87.1 (30.6)
Mean daily minimum °F (°C)	49.5 (9.7)	51.3 (10.7)	54.7 (12.6)	58.8 (14.9)	64.8 (18.2)	71.6 (22.0)	79.0 (26.1)	78.6 (25.9)	74.3 (23.5)	66.4 (19.1)	56.1 (13.4)	48.4 (9.1)	62.8 (17.1)
Average precipitation inches (mm)	0.68 (17)	0.80 (20)	0.40 (10)	0.07 (1.8)	0.04 (1.0)	0.01 (0.25)	0.29 (7.4)	0.48 (12)	0.37 (9.4)	0.21 (5.3)	0.29 (7.4)	0.61 (15)	4.20 (107)
Source: deepcanyon.ucnrs.org

== Demographics ==
Historical population
Census	Pop.	Note	%±
1970	1,298		—
1980	6,281		383.9%
1990	9,778		55.7%
2000	13,249		35.5%
2010	17,218		30.0%
2020	16,999		−1.3%
2024 (est.)	18,001	▲	5.9%
U.S. Decennial Census

=== Racial and ethnic composition ===
Rancho Mirage, California – Racial and ethnic composition Note: the US Census treats Hispanic/Latino as an ethnic category. This table excludes Latinos from the racial categories and assigns them to a separate category. Hispanics/Latinos may be of any race.
Race / Ethnicity (NH = Non-Hispanic)	Pop 1980	Pop 1990	Pop 2000	Pop 2010	Pop 2020	% 1980	% 1990	% 2000	% 2010	% 2020
White alone (NH)	5,958	8,855	11,559	14,065	13,032	94.86%	90.56%	87.24%	81.69%	76.66%
Black or African American alone (NH)	29	125	115	235	311	0.46%	1.28%	0.87%	1.36%	1.83%
Native American or Alaska Native alone (NH)	33	31	19	61	50	0.53%	0.32%	0.14%	0.35%	0.29%
Asian alone (NH)	29	86	160	639	727	0.46%	0.88%	1.21%	3.71%	4.28%
Native Hawaiian or Pacific Islander alone (NH)	29	86	14	13	27	0.46%	0.88%	0.11%	0.08%	0.16%
Other race alone (NH)	15	7	14	30	90	0.24%	0.07%	0.11%	0.17%	0.53%
Mixed race or Multiracial (NH)	x	x	117	211	502	x	x	0.88%	1.23%	2.95%
Hispanic or Latino (any race)	217	674	1,251	1,964	2,260	3.45%	6.89%	9.44%	11.41%	13.92%
Total	6,281	9,778	13,249	17,218	16,999	100.00%	100.00%	100.00%	100.00%	100.00%

=== 2020 census ===
As of the 2020 census, Rancho Mirage had a population of 16,999. The population density was 670.5 inhabitants per square mile (258.9/km^{2}).

The age distribution was 7.7% under the age of 18, 3.0% aged 18 to 24, 9.4% aged 25 to 44, 27.3% aged 45 to 64, and 52.5% who were 65 years of age or older. The median age was 66.2 years. For every 100 females, there were 101.8 males, and for every 100 females age 18 and over there were 102.3 males age 18 and over.

The census reported that 97.3% of the population lived in households, 0.2% lived in non-institutionalized group quarters, and 2.6% were institutionalized. 98.8% of residents lived in urban areas, while 1.2% lived in rural areas.

There were 8,777 households, of which 9.7% included children under the age of 18. Of all households, 47.9% were married-couple households, 6.2% were cohabiting couple households, 27.8% had a female householder with no spouse or partner present, and 18.2% had a male householder with no spouse or partner present. 35.9% of households were one person, and 24.7% were one person aged 65 or older. The average household size was 1.88. There were 4,990 families (56.9% of all households).

There were 14,202 housing units at an average density of 560.2 units per square mile (216.3 units/km^{2}). Of housing units, 61.8% were occupied and 38.2% were vacant. Of occupied units, 80.9% were owner-occupied and 19.1% were occupied by renters. The homeowner vacancy rate was 4.1% and the rental vacancy rate was 12.1%.

Racial composition as of the 2020 census
Race	Number	Percent
White	13,445	79.1%
Black or African American	321	1.9%
American Indian and Alaska Native	81	0.5%
Asian	754	4.4%
Native Hawaiian and Other Pacific Islander	28	0.2%
Some other race	1,052	6.2%
Two or more races	1,318	7.8%

=== 2023 estimates ===
In 2023, the US Census Bureau estimated that 16.7% of the population were foreign-born. Of all people aged 5 or older, 80.9% spoke only English at home, 10.9% spoke Spanish, 5.2% spoke other Indo-European languages, 2.5% spoke Asian or Pacific Islander languages, and 0.5% spoke other languages. Of those aged 25 or older, 94.9% were high school graduates and 46.5% had a bachelor's degree.

The median household income in 2023 was $109,943, and the per capita income was $87,637. About 9.3% of families and 10.9% of the population were below the poverty line.

=== 2010 census ===
The 2010 United States census reported that Rancho Mirage had a population of 17,218. The population density was 693.3 inhabitants per square mile (267.7/km^{2}). The racial makeup of Rancho Mirage was 15,267 (88.7%) White (81.7% Non-Hispanic White), 256 (1.5%) African American, 94 (0.5%) Native American, 651 (3.8%) Asian, 14 (0.1%) Pacific Islander, 598 (3.5%) from other races, and 338 (2.0%) from two or more races. Hispanic or Latino of any race were 1,964 persons (11.4%).

The census reported that 17,154 people (99.6% of the population) lived in households, 16 (0.1%) lived in non-institutionalized group quarters, and 48 (0.3%) were institutionalized.

There were 8,829 households, 1,031 (11.7%) had children under the age of 18 living in them, 4,159 (47.1%) were opposite-sex married couples living together, 453 (5.1%) had a female householder with no husband present, 213 (2.4%) had a male householder with no wife present. There were 316 (3.6%) unmarried opposite-sex partnerships, and 454 (5.1%) same-sex married couples or partnerships. 3,055 households (34.6%) were one person and 1,961 (22.2%) had someone living alone who was 65 or older. The average household size was 1.94. There were 4,825 families (54.6% of households); the average family size was 2.46.

The age distribution was 1,828 people (10.6%) under the age of 18, 508 people (3.0%) aged 18 to 24, 1,885 people (10.9%) aged 25 to 44, 5,415 people (31.4%) aged 45 to 64, and 7,582 people (44.0%) who were 65 or older. The median age was 62.3 years. For every 100 females, there were 97.7 males. For every 100 females age 18 and over, there were 97.2 males.

There were 14,243 housing units at an average density of 573.5 per square mile; of the occupied units 7,089 (80.3%) were owner-occupied and 1,740 (19.7%) were rented. The homeowner vacancy rate was 5.0%; the rental vacancy rate was 17.2%. 13,845 people (80.4% of the population) lived in owner-occupied housing units and 3,309 people (19.2%) lived in rental housing units.

Between 2009 and 2013, Rancho Mirage had a median household income of $77,526, with 13.6% of the population living below the federal poverty line.

Rancho Mirage owes its legacy to being a retirement haven for senior citizens since the 1950s.

== Economy ==
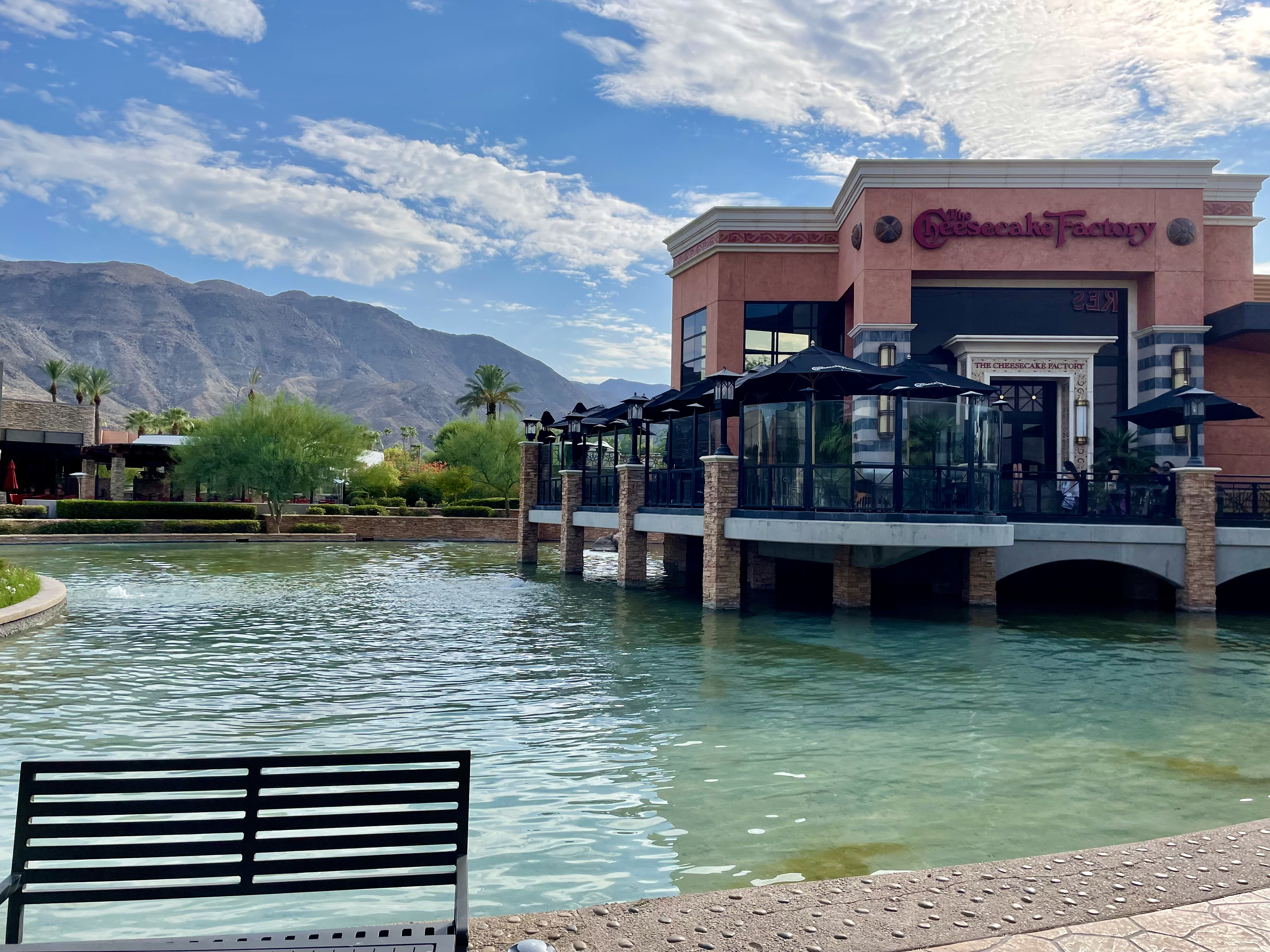
The River at Rancho Mirage

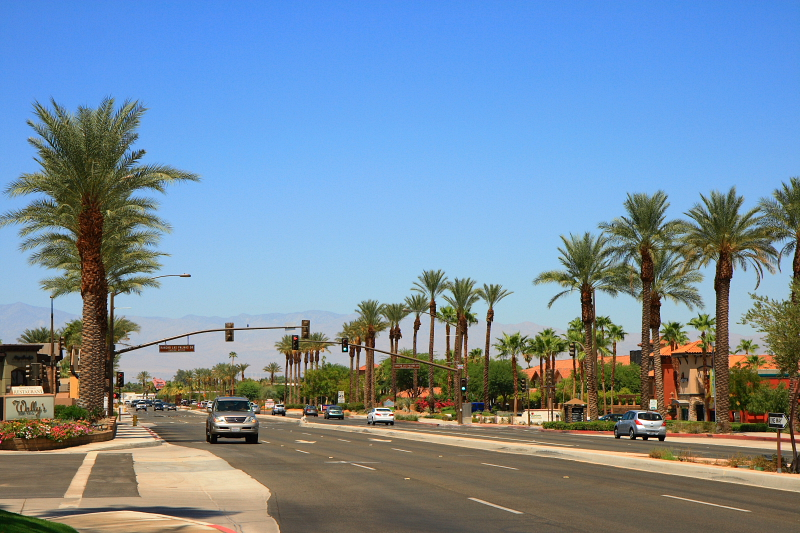
California State Route 111 in Rancho Mirage

The Rancho Mirage City Council has adopted a $28.8 million budget for fiscal year 2021–22. Sales and hotel taxes are the two biggest sources of revenue for the city, making up 51 percent of Rancho Mirage's annual revenue. Transient occupancy taxes (TOT) provides 31 percent of the revenue, while sales taxes, Rancho Mirage's second-biggest revenue source, make up nearly 20 percent of city revenue. About 43 percent of city expenditures are allocated to public safety, the city's biggest annual expense. Most of this expense is allocated to the Riverside County Sheriff's Department.

The River at Rancho Mirage is an outdoor venue for entertainment, dining, and shopping. It is home to a variety of shops, restaurants, an amphitheater, a gallery, and a multiscreen movie theater. The surrounding area has been named Downtown Rancho Mirage.

=== Top employers ===
According to Rancho Mirage Economic Development, 10,000 people are employed by 1,700 different business organizations. According to Rancho Mirage's 2025 Comprehensive Annual Financial Report, the top employers in the city were:

Rank	Employer	No. of Employees
1	Omni Rancho Las Palmas Resort & Spa	500 to 999
2	Agua Caliente Casino	250 to 499
3	Bennion Deville Homes	250 to 499
4	Eisenhower Primary Care 365	250 to 499
5	Eisenhower Urgent Care	250 to 499
6	Environment Protection Solutions	250 to 499
7	Mission Hills Country Club	250 to 499
8	Rancho Mirage Health & Rehabilitation Center	250 to 499
9	Rancho Mirage Surgery Center	250 to 499
10	Westin Mission Hills Resort and Spa	250 to 499

Notable hotels and resorts include The Ritz-Carlton, The Westin Mission Hills Golf Resort and Spa, The Omni Las Palmas, Sensei Porcupine Creek, and the Agua Caliente Casino Resort Spa. The Ritz-Carlton Rancho Mirage (formerly The Lodge at Rancho Mirage) is a five-star resort situated at a secluded location in the foothills of the Santa Rosa Mountains. This luxury resort has 244 rooms, a 25,000-square-foot (2,300 m^{2}) spa, and three swimming pools. It is situated on 24 acres (9.7 ha) of land on a 650 ft (200 m) plateau in the Santa Rosa Mountains.

The Agua Caliente Casino Resort Spa has over 1,000 slot machines and video games, 49 gaming tables, and regular live entertainment. There are also several bars, pools, lounges, a 1,000-seat showroom, and six restaurants at the casino resort. It is a $205 million casino resort with 340 rooms and sixteen stories.

The now public 18-hole golf course at Desert Island Golf & Country Club, which was formerly known as The S at Rancho Mirage and Sinatra Resort & Country Club, was designed by British-American golfer Desmond Muirhead. Located on 160 acres (65 ha), the country club has 226 units and three separate condo buildings. A seven-story building is located on an island in the club's 25-acre (0.10 km^{2}) artificial lake. It is located across Frank Sinatra Dr. from Sunnylands.

== Arts and culture ==
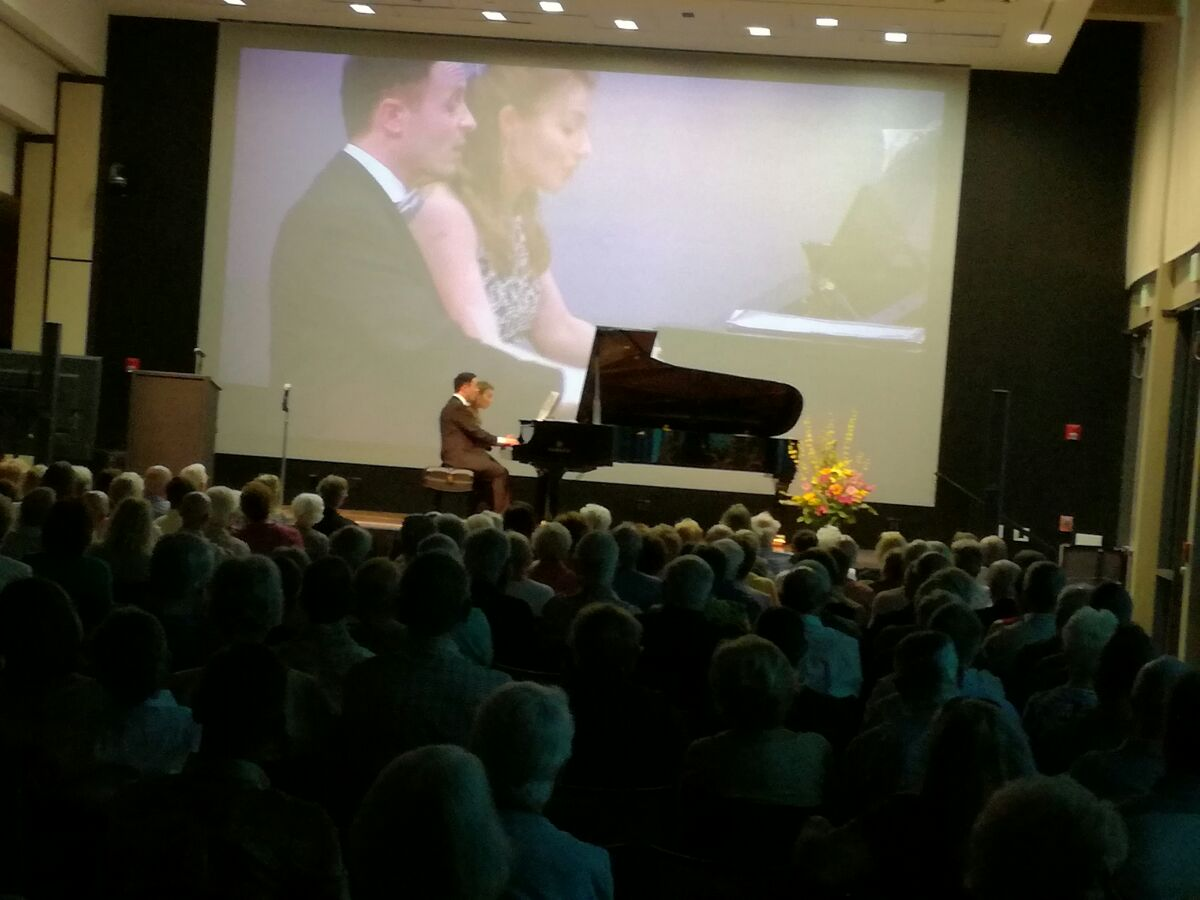
The Latsos Piano Duo performing at the Rancho Mirage Library and Observatory

The annual two-day Rancho Mirage Art Affaire is held in Rancho Mirage Community Park (formerly Whitewater Park) and is a fine art and jazz festival held every November. It is an annual weekend celebration with entertainment, food vendors, and art. The Art Affaire features about 100 arts and crafts exhibits but also food, jazz entertainment, wine tasting, and more. It is Rancho Mirage's biggest community event and attracts 10,000 annual visitors.

The Rancho Mirage Amphitheater, which is located in Rancho Mirage Community Park, was established in 2016 and offers free concerts throughout the year. It plays host to the free annual outdoor concert series "Music in the Park". The amphitheater has seating for up to 1,000 spectators. Entertainers at the venue have included Blue Öyster Cult, Rodney Atkins, Thompson Square, Pam Tillis, Pablo Cruise, Thelma Houston, Roberta Gambarini, Maxine Nightingale, Diane Schuur, and Mickey Thomas.

The Children's Discovery Museum of the Desert has interactive exhibits and programs focused on the local natural environment. The museum features instructive exhibits, picnic areas, an outdoor amphitheater, miniature rock-climbing areas, a sculpture wall, a rope maze, and more. There is also an archeological dig where children can search for Cahuilla artifacts.

The Rancho Mirage Library and Observatory features 62,000 volumes and regularly hosts musical events, exhibits, and various programs. The library hosts the annual International Classical Concert Series along with a number of other musical performances. Public events at the library also include exhibits, movie screenings, book discussions, lectures, family outings, and more. It has been named one of the best libraries in California.

The botanical gardens at Sunnylands Center and Gardens feature over 53,000 plants in its 9 acres (3.6 ha) of desert gardens. The desert botanical gardens opened to the public in 2012 and have a 1.25-mile (2 km) walking path with 70 species of arid plants surrounded by views of Mount San Jacinto. Guided tours are offered at the historic landmark, which is situated at the foothills of the San Jacinto Mountains. The botanical gardens were designed by architect James Burnett using Vincent van Gogh's artwork series Olive Trees as his inspiration. The gardens feature rows of Golden barrel cactus, Moroccan mound cactus, Artichoke agave, and species such as Pink hesperaloe, Spanish bayonet, and Palo verde.

=== Architecture ===
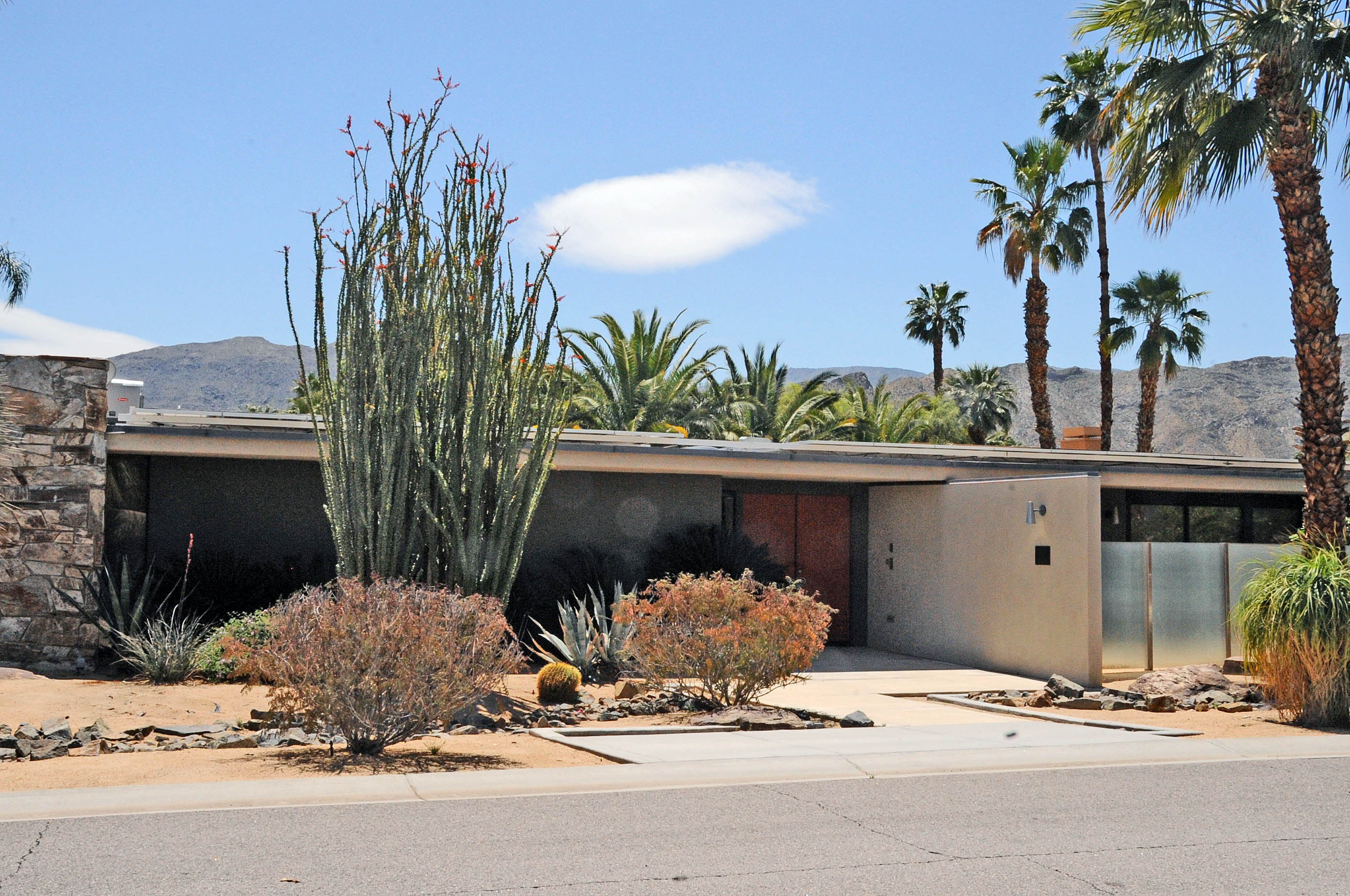
The Kenaston House is listed on the U.S. National Register of Historic Places.

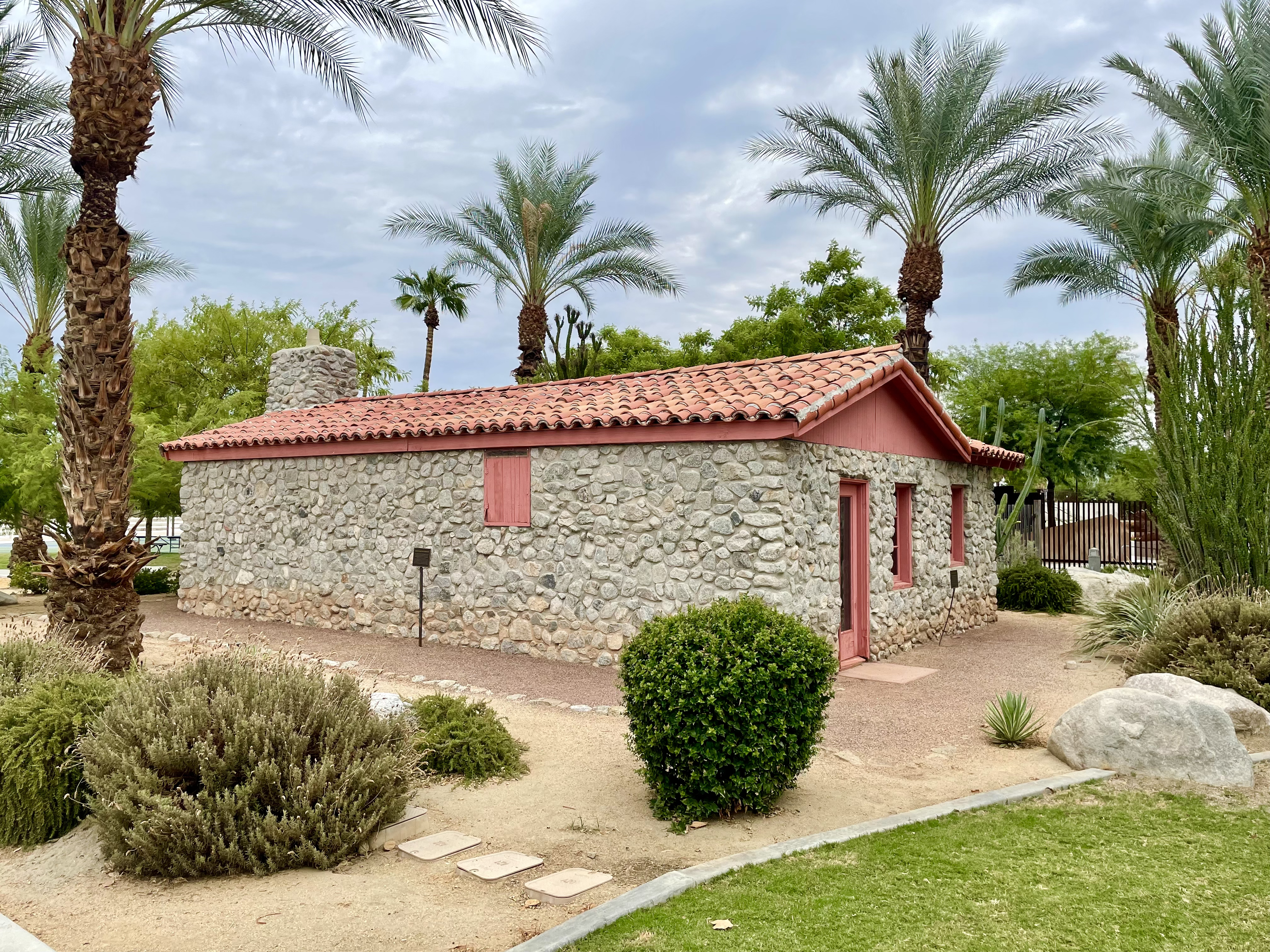
Casa Chiquita (Ranchito Chiquito) is the oldest house in Rancho Mirage.

The 1957 Kenaston House was added to the U.S. National Register of Historic Places in 2016 due to its local architectural significance. Architect E. Stewart Williams designed its distinctive mid-century modern design and U-shaped form. It has cantilevered rooflines, open floor plans, walnut walls, and an exterior of corrugated aluminum and natural rock. The house has been featured in magazines such as W and Elle, and photoshoots for celebrities such as Angelina Jolie, Brad Pitt, Madonna, James Blunt, and Coldplay have taken place at the Kenaston House. The house has four bedrooms, three baths, fifty palm trees, and a six-car garage. It was built for local resident Roderick W. Kenaston.

Another structure known for its mid-century modern architecture, the 1962 Samuel and Luella Maslon House designed by architect Richard Neutra, was demolished in 2002.

As of 2021, there are 72 structures listed on the Rancho Mirage Register of Historic Places, including celebrity homes previously owned by Kaye Ballard, Red Skelton, and Gummo Marx. The houses are designed by notable architects such as E. Stewart Williams, William Cody, Wallace Neff, Hugh M. Kaptur, and Archibald Quincy Jones. The city's oldest house, the 1934 Casa Chiquita (Ranchito Chiquito) was the first structure added to the register when designated a historic site on June 1, 2003. The 850 sq. ft. house, which was constructed by the Les and M.C. Clancy brothers, was located on the corner of Rancho Palmeras and Follansbee Rd. from 1934 to 2004. In 2004, it was relocated and reassembled at Rancho Mirage Community Park, one block west of the River at Rancho Mirage. The ranch-style house is constructed with Mediterranean Revival elements and of local rock from the Whitewater River.

The Club at Morningside and Sunnylands were added to the city's Register of Historic Places due to President George H. W. Bush's official summit with Prime Minister Toshiki Kaifu in Rancho Mirage on March 2–3 in 1990.

=== Places of interest ===
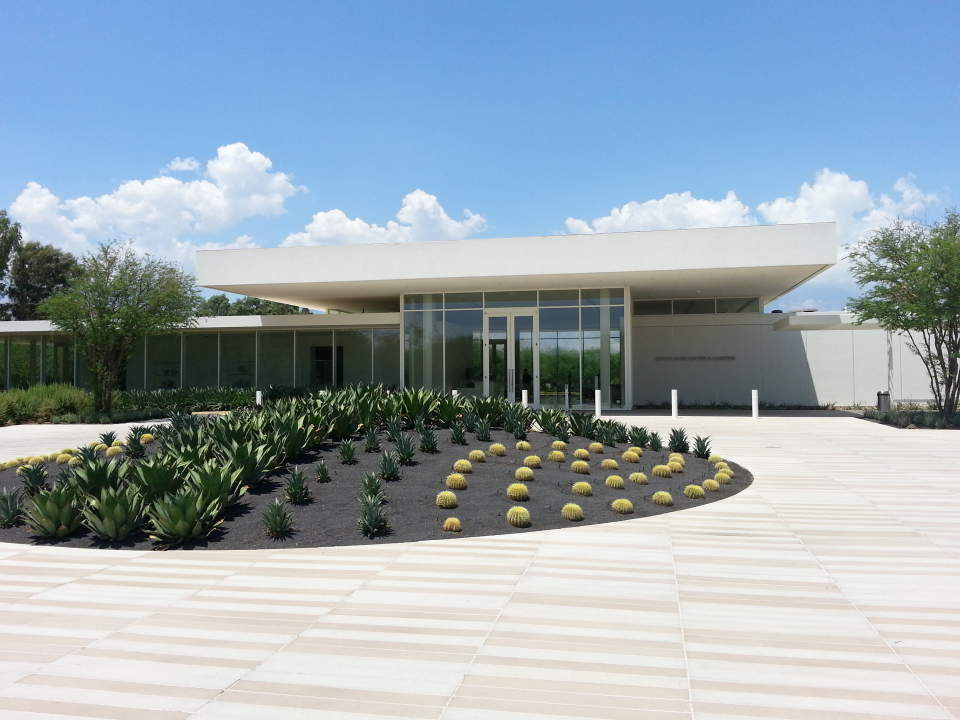
Sunnylands Visitor Center

- Rancho Mirage Library and Observatory, a beautiful cultural center, home to five telescopes and a 360-degree research-grade dome telescope, and loans out other telescopes for home use
- Sunnylands Center & Gardens, historic estate offering tours. Designated an historic site by the city.
- Agua Caliente Casino Resort Spa, $205 million casino resort with occasional concerts and live entertainment
- Mission Hills Country Club, host of the ANA Inspiration
- Thunderbird Country Club, first golf resort established in a desert environment.
- The River at Rancho Mirage, outdoor shopping and dining center in Downtown Rancho Mirage
- Children's Discovery Museum of the Desert, children's museum with exhibits focused on the local natural environment
- Tamarisk Country Club ("The Compound"), former home to the Rat Pack
- Kenaston House, historic building listed on the U.S. National Register of Historic Places
- Santa Rosa and San Jacinto Mountains National Monument, U.S. National Monument that consists of 280,071 acres of wilderness

== Sports ==
Tamarisk Country Club has hosted the Bob Hope Classic nineteen times. Thunderbird Country Club has hosted the Ryder Cup and the Desert Classic of the PGA Tour. It also held a PGA Tour event from 1952 to 1959 and was one of the original golf courses in the tournament that later became the Bob Hope Classic. Mission Hills Country Club hosted the Davis Cup finals in 1978. The Chevron Championship was held at Mission Hills Country Club from 1972 to 2022, one of five major championships in women's professional golf (LPGA).

Rancho Mirage has 12 or 13 golf courses, also known as country clubs or golf resorts. The city's first resort was the Thunderbird Guest Ranch, opened in 1946 for entertainers and business clientele. Other golf resorts are The S at Rancho Mirage, Tamarisk, Mission Hills, Thunderbird, The Springs, Sunrise, Omni Resorts Rancho Las Palmas hotel (opened in 1979 to replace the Desert Air golf and private airport from 1954 to 1978), Morningside, Mission Hills North Course, Westin Hotels Mission Hills resort and Tuscania by Sunrise Company opened in 2006.

== Recreation ==
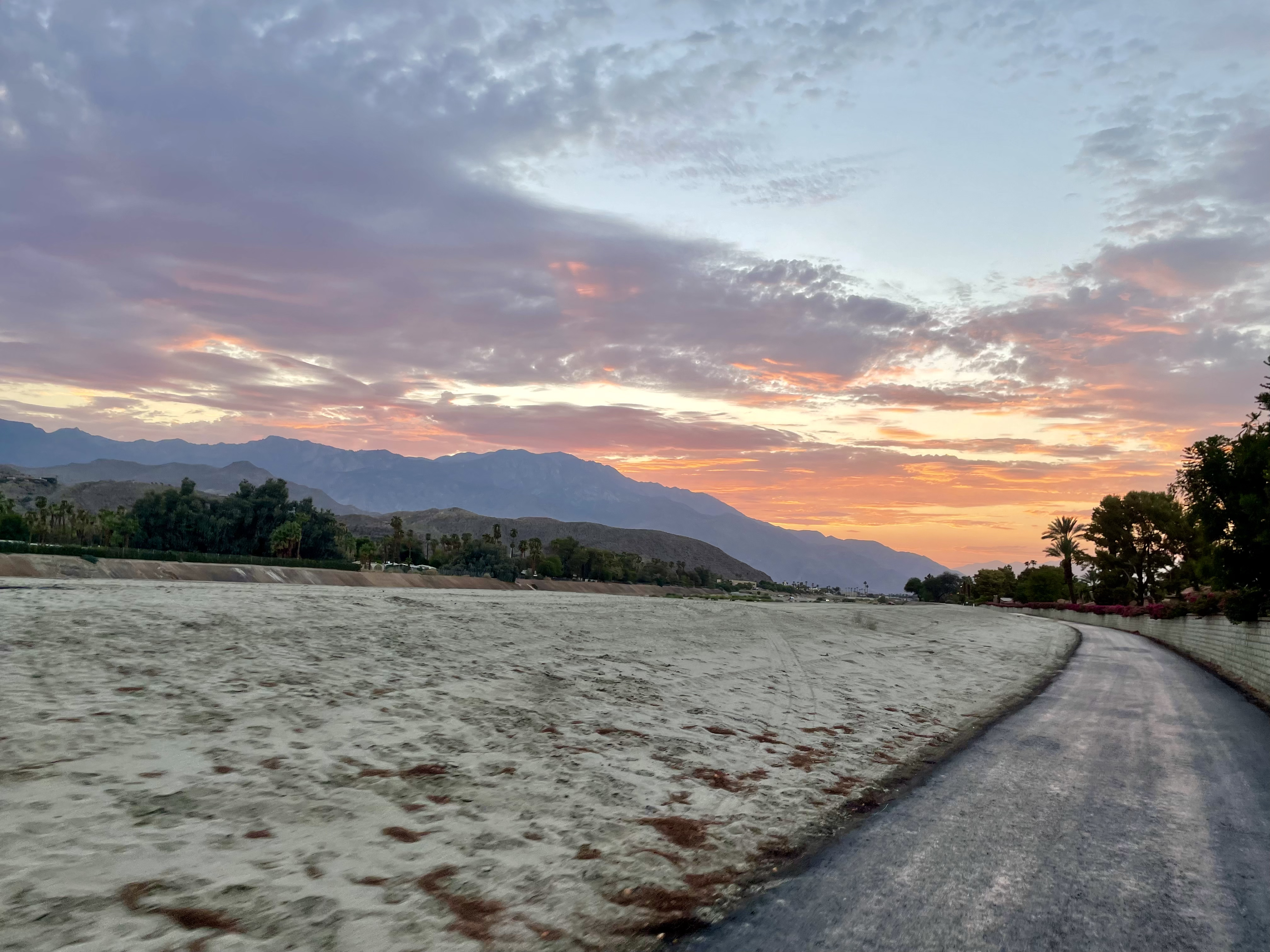
San Jacinto Mountains as seen near Wolfson Park

Some of the most visited hiking trails in the Coachella Valley are found within city limits. Some trails here include the Jack Rabbit Trail, Road Runner Trail, and Big Horn Overlook Trail, which has a trailhead by the Rancho Mirage City Hall. Access to the Mirada Trail System is located behind Rancho Mirage City Hall where trailheads can be found for a number of trails, including the Bighorn Overlook Trail, Chuckwalla Trail, Jack Rabbit Trail, and Road Runner Trail.

Other trails include the Chuckwalla Trail, Butler-Abrams Trail, and the Clancy Lane Trail, which has a trailhead in Rancho Mirage Community Park. An additional trail, the Mirage Trail (also known as the 'Bump and Grind' or the Desert Drive Trail), climbs the Santa Rosa Mountains and offers panoramic views of the surrounding Coachella Valley and neighboring mountains, including views of the San Jacinto Mountains, Salton Sea, La Quinta, and other desert sights. The trail connects with other mountain trails, including Art Smith Trail and Hopalong Cassidy, which leads to Homme-Adams Park in Palm Desert. Its trailhead is located at Desert Drive and follows a wide dirt and gravel path up the Santa Rosa Mountains. It joins the Magnesia Falls Trail after less than a mile.

City officials in Rancho Mirage have worked with the U.S. Bureau of Land Management to further expand and improve desert trail networks. The city also operates various nature and wildlife reserves, such as the Magnesia Springs Ecological Reserve and Rancho Mirage Mountain Reserve, two of several reserves established within city limits to provide habitat for the Peninsular Bighorn Sheep and other local wildlife.

There are six Cahuilla cultural heritage sites within the city limits of Rancho Mirage, including Bradley Canyon, Magnesia Spring, and Edom Hill (Indio Hills).

Parts of the city lie within the Santa Rosa and San Jacinto Mountains National Monument, which makes up 280,071 acres and borders Rancho Mirage in the southwest.

=== Parks ===
The city operates the following five public parks:

- Blixseth Mountain Park (access near the corner of Indian Trail and Mirage Road): 7-acre desert mountain park at the foothills of the Santa Rosa Mountains, accessed by a wooden bridge. Features desert landscape, Bighorn sheep displays, trails, native flora, and mountain vistas. The park was dedicated on April 19, 2002, and it is located immediately east of the Magnesia Storm Channel.
- Rancho Mirage Community Park (formerly Whitewater Park): 8.8-acre park featuring a fitness trail, picnic areas, a playground, an amphitheater, and sports facilities including two basketball courts, four tennis courts, and two handball courts. The city's oldest home dating to 1934 was moved to this park in 2004. The park also hosts annual concerts and events such as the Rancho Mirage Art Affaire. The park is located adjacent to Whitewater River and was originally developed in 1982. The park was expanded in 1994 and in 2015.
- Rancho Mirage Dog Park: 4-acre park which opened in 2016 on the intersection of Key Largo Ave. and Via Vail.
- Richard & Annette Bloch Cancer Survivors Park: park adjacent to Rancho Mirage City Hall dedicated as a tribute to survivors of cancer. It is part of the series of parks known as Cancer Survivors Park. It has bronze sculptures, walkways, tiled benches, and a waterfall.
- Michael S. Wolfson Park (trailhead for the Butler-Abrams Trail): 1.7-acre park landscaped with native palm and cactus gardens. The park was dedicated in 1986 and has a Victorian theme. There are several walking paths, decorative lights, picnic areas, bronze Braille plaques, and fountains. The red button near the entrance greets visitors with a recorded message from longtime local resident Frank Sinatra. The park is named for Michael S. Wolfson, mayor of Rancho Mirage from 1973 to 1986.

An additional park, the 1.3-acre Magnesia Falls Neighborhood Park, is adjacent to Rancho Mirage Elementary School. It is a joint-use facility operated in conjunction with the Family YMCA of the Desert and the Palm Springs Unified School District. The park opened in 1999 and is equipped with a playground, benches, picnic areas, and ball fields.

=== Nature reserves ===
==== Magnesia Spring Ecological Reserve ====
The Magnesia Spring Ecological Reserve, a 3,800-acre area, was designated a nature reserve by the California Department of Fish and Wildlife in 1975. It is home to wildlife such as the Peninsular bighorn sheep, Coyote, Bobcat, Gray fox, Prairie falcon, Golden eagle, Gambel's quail, and Mourning dove. It became a reserve to preserve and rehabilitate both habitat and access to freshwater sources for the Bighorn sheep. Magnesia Spring Canyon is the only desert palm oasis within city limits. The ecological reserve is located in Magnesia Springs Canyon and is an important habitat site for sensitive species such as the Peninsular Bighorn Sheep, Bell's Vireo, Southwestern Willow Flycatcher, and the Prairie Falcon. It is managed by the California Department of Fish and Wildlife.

Hiking is permitted in the reserve parts of the year. It can be accessed from trails such as the Mirage Trail and Magnesia Spring Falls Trail. It can be reached by following the trail to Magnesia Falls, which has its trailhead at Blixseth Mountain Park, next to Rancho Mirage Elementary School. This trail leads to a variety of oases and waterfalls in the Santa Rosa Mountains and is closed from January 1 to September 30 in order to protect the native Peninsular bighorn sheep. Lower Magnesia Falls is 2.5 miles roundtrip from Blixseth Mountain Park, while the Upper Magnesia Falls waterfall is a 6.5-mile roundtrip hike. This trail eventually joins the Art Smith Trail.

==== Rancho Mirage Mountain Reserve ====
Rancho Mirage was the first Coachella Valley city to establish a mountain reserve within its city limits. Rancho Mirage Mountain Reserve, which is approximately two square miles (1,300 acres), was established to provide habitat for the Peninsular Bighorn Sheep. It consists of rocky terrain and a series of canyons and creeks in the Santa Rosa Mountains.

== Government ==
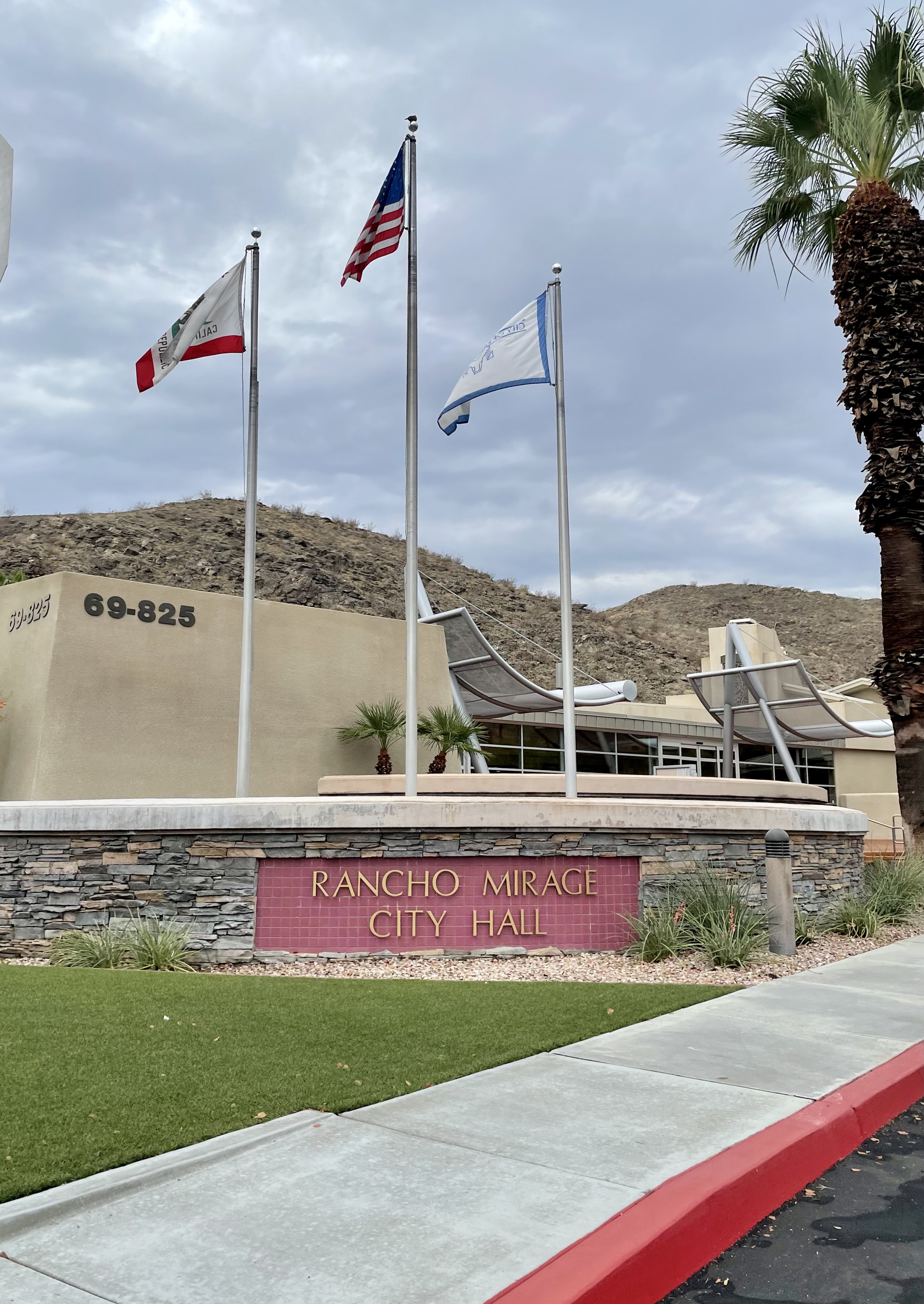
Rancho Mirage City Hall

In the California State Legislature, Rancho Mirage is in the 19th senatorial district, represented by Republican Rosilicie Ochoa Bogh, and in the 47th Assembly district, represented by Republican Greg Wallis.

In the United States House of Representatives, Rancho Mirage is in California's 41st congressional district, represented by Republican Ken Calvert.

The tribal government of the Agua Caliente Band of Cahuilla Indians governs over parts of the city where reservation jurisdictions overlap.

In the 2020 U.S. presidential election, 57.8 percent voted for Joe Biden, while 41.2 percent voted for Donald Trump. Hillary Clinton won the 2016 U.S. presidential election in Rancho Mirage.

Rancho Mirage City Hall is located at the intersection of California State Route 111 and Frank Sinatra Dr. It was previously Merton Baker's real estate office.

== Education ==
There is one elementary school (Rancho Mirage Elementary) and one high school, Rancho Mirage High School, which are part of the Palm Springs Unified School District, the newly renovated Nellie Coffman Middle School is on the city line with Cathedral City. Palm Valley School is the only private school in the city and covers grades preschool-12th. PSUSD has planned a new grade-middle school complex on the lands of the former Walter Annenberg estate donated to the school district. Rancho Mirage is also home to a campus of Santa Barbara Business College, a private college that offers academic degrees and career training.

== Notable people ==
- Stuart Anderson – restaurateur
- Walter Annenberg – ambassador, publisher, philanthropist
- Desi Arnaz – actor, director, musician
- Spiro Agnew – 39th Vice President of the United States; also his wife Judy Agnew
- Timothy Blixseth – real estate developer, timber baron
- Johnny Bench – MLB player
- Jack Benny – entertainer
- Edgar Bergen – actor
- Barbara Boxer – United States Senator
- Harry Caray – baseball broadcaster
- Michele Carey – actress
- Carol Channing – actress
- Sydney Chaplin – actor, singer, restaurateur
- Hoagy Carmichael – actor, songwriter
- Broderick Crawford – actor
- Bing and Kathryn Crosby – actors and singers
- Covelli "Coco" Crisp – MLB player
- Brad Dexter – actor
- Billie Dove – actress
- Larry Ellison – business magnate, co-founder and chief executive of Oracle Corporation
- Alice Faye – actress
- Bruce Fessier – journalist
- Gerald Ford – 38th President of the United States; also his wife Betty Ford
- Jacqueline Gagne – golfer
- Al Geiberger – golfer
- Tom Gamboa – baseball coach and manager
- Gary Graver – director, cinematographer. Died in Rancho Mirage
- Gale Anne Hurd – film producer
- Phil Harris – actor, comedian, bandleader. Voice of Baloo in Disney's The Jungle Book
- Donald Holmquest – astronaut, physician
- Don Hutson – professional football player
- Beverly Johnson – model, actress, author
- Gregg Juarez – art dealer, gallerist, philanthropist
- Stubby Kaye – actor
- Ralph Kiner – baseball player, broadcaster
- Desirae Krawczyk – tennis player
- Peter Lawford – actor
- Rod Laver – Australian tennis player
- Shelby Lynne – musician, singer, producer, owner of Everso Records, actress
- Patrick Macnee – British actor
- Gummo Marx – actor
- Harpo Marx – actor, comedian
- Zeppo Marx – actor, comedian
- Mary Martin – actress
- Michael Masser – songwriter
- Kiel Martin – actor
- Gene Barry – actor
- Frank Marth – actor
- Dean Martin – singer and actor
- George Montgomery – actor
- Alan Morgan – sailor
- Dennis L. Montgomery – computer software designer
- Danny Kaye – actor
- Jenna Ortega – actress
- Perry Como – singer
- Lucille Ball – actress
- Kaye Ballard – actress
- Esther Williams – actress
- Anne Rice – writer
- Buddy Rich - drummer
- Buddy Rogers – actor
- Ginger Rogers – actress
- Al Rosen – Major League Baseball MVP, 4x All Star
- Sammy Davis Jr. – singer
- Dinah Shore – singer, TV personality
- Frank Sinatra – singer, actor
- Red Skelton – comedian, actor
- Lee Surkowski – All-American Girls Professional Baseball League baseball player
- Don Sutton - Los Angeles Dodgers Major League Baseball baseball player
- Ken Venturi – World Golf Hall of Fame and broadcaster. Winner of the 1964 U.S. Open
- Lorna Luft – singer, actress
- Hal B. Wallis – film producer
- Howie Richmond – music industry executive
- Mark Woodforde – tennis champion
- Jane Wyman – actress
- Daniel Whelan – professional football player

== In popular culture ==
At least two novels, Love Child by Andrew Neiderman (1986) and Generation X: Tales for an Accelerated Culture by Douglas Coupland (1991), are set in Rancho Mirage. Both have references to the city and to Palm Springs, as well as the Mojave Desert. A third book, Rancho Mirage: an American Tragedy of Manners, Madness, and Murder by Aram Saroyan (2002), concerns a murder that occurred in the city.

The Bob Cummings Show, a sitcom series starring Bob Cummings, was partially filmed at the Desert Air Hotel and Airpark (today known as Rancho Las Palmas Country Club). The airplane chartering scenes in the Oscar-winning film It's a Mad, Mad, Mad, Mad World (1963) were also shot at the resort. Scenes in the movie also feature Bob Hope Drive and what later would become the Agua Caliente Casino Resort Spa. A Warner Bros. film, Two Guys from Texas (1948), was filmed at Thunderbird Ranch in Rancho Mirage. In 1926, filming took place in Rancho Mirage for the 1928 film The Vanishing Pioneer starring Jack Holt.

The Tamarisk Country Club was featured in the sixth episode of the 2003 Bravo show Boy Meets Boy. The 2003 ABC miniseries Trista & Ryan's Wedding was filmed at The Lodge at Rancho Mirage, now known as the Ritz-Carlton Rancho Mirage.

== Sources ==
- Ankerich, Michael G. (2011). The Sound of Silence: Conversations with 16 Film and Stage Personalities Who Bridged the Gap Between Silents and Talkies. McFarland. ISBN 978-0-7864-6383-1.
- Baker, Christopher P. (2008). Explorer's Guide Palm Springs & Desert Resorts: A Great Destination. The Countryman Press. ISBN 978-1-58157-048-9.
- Bignell, Rob (2019). Day Hiking Trails of Palm Springs and the Coachella Valley. Atiswinic Press. ISBN 978-1-948872-04-1.
- Blough, Jenna (2019). Moon Joshua Tree & Palm Springs. Avalon Publishing. ISBN 978-1-64049-047-5.
- Bohannan, Larry (2015). Palm Springs Golf: A History of Coachella Valley Legends & Fairways. Arcadia Publishing. ISBN 978-1-62619-963-7.
- Burnett, James; Irish, Mary; Gallagher, Michaeleen (2014). Art and Nature: The Gardens at Sunnylands. Annenberg Foundation at Sunnylands. ISBN 978-0-9858429-7-0.
- Clevenger, Joyce M (1980). A cultural resources reconnaissance for the Rancho Mirage Flood Control Project, Riverside County, California. OCLC 1013752882.
- Copp, Nelson (2008). Cycling the Palm Springs Region. Sunbelt Publications. ISBN 978-0-932653-93-2.
- Cornett, James W. (2008). Wonders of the Coachella Valley: A Nature Guide. Nature Trails Press. ISBN 978-0-937794-43-2.
- Dinzes, Deborah (1993). A Guide to California's Historic Sites & Museums. American Traveler Press. ISBN 978-1-55838-134-6.
- Drew, William M. (1999). At the Center of the Frame: Leading Ladies of the Twenties and Thirties. Vestal Press. ISBN 978-1-879511-42-2.
- Garner, Randall (2020). Palm Springs: History of a Desert Playground. Independently Published. ISBN 979-8-6457-6464-7.
- Johns, Howard (2004). Palm Springs Confidential: Playground of the Stars!. Barricade Books. ISBN 978-1-56980-269-4.
- Kath, Laura; Price, Pamela (2010). Day Trips® from Los Angeles: Getaway Ideas for the Local Traveler. Rowman & Littlefield. ISBN 978-0-7627-6716-8.
- Kremer, Lydia (2019). 100 Things to Do in Palm Springs Before You Die, Second Edition. Reedy Press. ISBN 978-1-68106-191-7.
- Mahler, Richard (2005). Palm Springs. Ulysses Press. ISBN 978-1-56975-431-3.
- Mallette, Leo A. (2011). Rancho Mirage. Arcadia Publishing. ISBN 978-1-4396-3932-0.
- McDowell, Lee (2021). Presidents as Military Officers, As Commander-in-Chief with Humor and Anecdotes. First Edition Design. ISBN 978-1-5069-1030-7.
- Meeks, Eric G. (2014). The Best Guide Ever to Palm Springs Celebrity Homes: Facts and Legends of the Village of Palm Springs. Horatio Limburger Oglethorpe. ISBN 978-0-9862189-0-3.
- Nalepa, Michael, ed. (2008). Fodor's Southern California 2008. Fodor's Travel Publications. ISBN 978-1-4000-1901-4.
- Niemann, Greg (2006). Palm Springs Legends: Creation of a Desert Oasis. Sunbelt. ISBN 978-0-932653-74-1.
- Olson, Donald (2017). The California Garden Tour: The 50 Best Gardens to Visit in the Golden State. Timber Press. ISBN 978-1-60469-830-5.
- Osbaldeston, Peter (2009). The Palm Springs Diner's Bible: A Restaurant Guide for Palm Springs, Cathedral City, Rancho Mirage, Palm Desert, Indian Wells, la Quinta, Bermuda Dunes, Indio, and Desert Hot Springs. Pelican Publishing. ISBN 978-1-58980-774-7.
- Patten, Carolyn (2006). Insiders' Guide to Palm Springs. Globe Pequot Press. ISBN 978-0-7627-3904-2.
- Pyle, Linda McMillin (1999). Peaks, Palms, and Picnics: Day Journeys in the Mountains and Deserts of Palm Springs and the Coachella Valley of Southern California. Xlibris Corporation. ISBN 978-0-7388-0362-3.
- Randall, Laura (2012). Day and Overnight Hikes: Palm Springs. Menasha Ridge Press. ISBN 978-0-89732-771-8.
- Randall, Laura (2016). Five-Star Trails: Palm Springs: 31 Spectacular Hikes in the Southern California Desert Resort Area. Menasha Ridge Press. ISBN 978-1-63404-038-9.
- Riche, Melissa; Riche, Jim (2018). Mod Mirage: The Midcentury Architecture of Rancho Mirage. Gibbs Smith. ISBN 978-1-4236-4876-5.
- Rough Guide (2011). The Rough Guide to California. Rough Guides UK. ISBN 978-1-4053-8902-0.
- Schwanke, Dean (1997). Resort Development Handbook. Urban Land Institute. ISBN 978-0-87420-784-2.
- Solesbury, William (2018). World Cities, City Worlds: Explorations with Icons, Metaphors and Perspectives. Cambridge Scholars Publishing. ISBN 978-1-5275-2363-0.
- Starr, Kevin (2011). Coast of Dreams. Knopf Doubleday Publishing Group. ISBN 978-0-307-79526-7.
- Van Vechten, Ken (2010). Insiders' Guide® to Palm Springs. Rowman & Littlefield. ISBN 978-0-7627-6157-9.
- Weingarten, David; Howard, Lucia (2009). Ranch Houses: Living the California Dream. Random House. ISBN 978-0-8478-3182-1.
- Whalen, John (2009). From The Plains...To Planes...And Other Plain Talk. Xlibris. ISBN 978-1-4628-0124-4.
- Woods, Christopher (2018). Gardenlust: A Botanical Tour of the World's Best New Gardens. Timber Press. ISBN 978-1-60469-797-1.
- Yenne, Bill (2020). The Complete Book of US Presidents. Book Sales. ISBN 978-0-7858-3845-6.
- Young, Don (2009). Southern California Adventure Guide. Hunter Publishing. ISBN 978-1-58843-091-5.
- Young, Don (2011). California's Palm Springs Area: Rancho Mirage, Palm Desert, Borrego Springs & Beyond. Hunter. ISBN 978-1-55650-213-2.
