= Desert Classic =

Professional golf tournament in California, United States

Coordinates: 33.643°N 116.268°W

The American Express
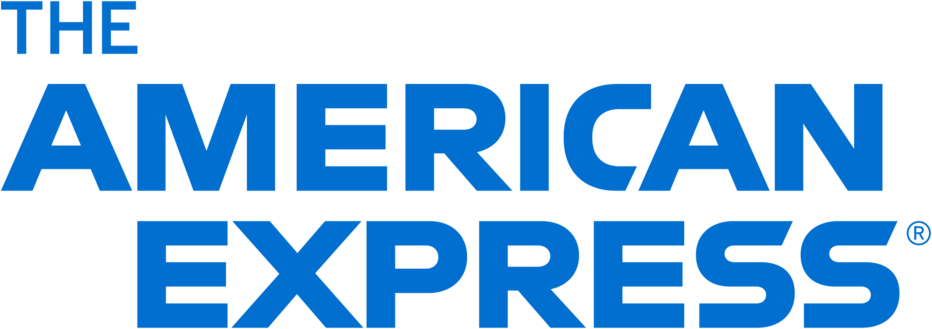

Tournament information
- Location: La Quinta, California
- Established: 1960
- Courses: La Quinta Country Club; PGA West (Stadium Course) (Nicklaus Tournament Course)
- Par: 72
- Length: 7,060 yards (6,460 m) (LQ); 7,140 yards (6,530 m) (S); 7,181 yards (6,566 m) (NT)
- Organized by: Impact Through Golf
- Tour: PGA Tour
- Format: Stroke play
- Prize fund: US$9,200,000
- Month played: January
- Website: theamexgolf.com

Tournament record score
- Aggregate: 72 holes: 259 Nick Dunlap (2024); 90 holes: 324 Joe Durant (2001)
- To par: 72 holes: −29 as above 90 holes: −36 as above

Current champion
- (United States) Scottie Scheffler

Location map
- Location in the United States Location in California

The American Express (previously known as the Desert Classic, CareerBuilder Challenge, Palm Springs Golf Classic, the Bob Hope Desert Classic, the Bob Hope Chrysler Classic, and the Humana Challenge) is a professional golf tournament in southern California on the PGA Tour. Played in mid-winter in the Coachella Valley, it is part of the tour's early season "West Coast Swing".

It previously had five rounds of competition (90 holes) rather than the standard of four rounds, and was known for its celebrity pro-am. For many years, the event was named for and hosted by entertainer Bob Hope and featured a number of celebrity participants.

In 2012, the Desert Classic changed to a traditional 72-hole format over three different courses with a 54-hole cut, similar to the AT&T Pebble Beach Pro-Am, and ended their celebrity pro-am. The tournament is organized by the nonprofit Impact Through Golf, which took over from Desert Classic Charities in 2020.

== History ==
Founded in 1960 as the Palm Springs Golf Classic, the tournament evolved from the Thunderbird Invitational that was held in Palm Springs the previous six years, from 1954 to 1959, but with a much smaller purse. The event was renamed the Bob Hope Desert Classic in 1965 and the Bob Hope Chrysler Classic in 1986.

Until 2012, its format remained unique among PGA Tour events, being played over five days and four different courses. In its first three years, the tournament was played at Thunderbird Country Club and Tamarisk Country Club, both in Rancho Mirage; Bermuda Dunes Country Club in Bermuda Dunes; and Indian Wells Country Club in Indian Wells. Bermuda Dunes was used through 2009 and Indian Wells through 2005. In 1963 Eldorado Country Club, also in Indian Wells, replaced Thunderbird Country Club. From 1964 until 1968 La Quinta Country Club in La Quinta, replaced Tamarisk Country Club, but in 1969 Tamarisk Country Club rejoined the event and alternated annually with Eldorado Country Club until 1986 (Tamarisk Country Club's last turn being in 1985).

An evolution towards courses more suited to modern professionals began in 1987. From 1987 until 1994, and again from 1998 to the present, a course at PGA West in La Quinta, (the TPC Stadium Golf Course in 1987 and the Arnold Palmer Private Course thereafter) became a permanent member of the roster; from 1995–97, Indian Ridge Country Club in Palm Desert replaced PGA West. To make room for a new permanent member, Eldorado Country Club and La Quinta Country Club alternated from 1987–89 (Eldorado being used in 87 and 89), after which Eldorado Country Club was dropped from the roster. From 1990–2003 Tamarisk Country Club and La Quinta Country Club followed a "1–2" alternating arrangement, where Tamarisk was played the first year and La Quinta CC the next two; this pattern was deviated from when Tamarisk was used in 2004 (a La Quinta CC year by the pattern), although the 2005, 2006 and 2007 events were then played at La Quinta CC.

In early 2005 a local charitable foundation gave its new course, The Classic Club in Palm Desert (an Arnold Palmer-designed track) to the tournament, making the Bob Hope Chrysler Classic the only event on the PGA Tour that owns its own facility. The Classic Club took the place of Indian Wells in 2006, but the course was dropped from the Hope course field after the 2008 event, citing players concerns over high winds.

The 2009 course rotation consisted of the Arnold Palmer Private Course and the Nicklaus Private Course (both at PGA West in La Quinta), SilverRock Resort (in La Quinta), and the Bermuda Dunes Country Club. In 2010, La Quinta CC replaced Bermuda Dunes CC. In 2012, SilverRock Resort dropped from the rotation due to the tournament shortening to 72 holes. In 2016, the main course was Pete Dye's PGA West Stadium Course, and also used PGA West’s Nicklaus Tournament course (originally designed for the 1991 Ryder Cup, the European Broadcasting Union objected because of the European domination of the tournament and a nine-hour time difference from Central European Time was inconvenient; the tournament moved east where only a six-hour time difference allowed the event to air in primetime hours), and La Quinta Country Club in the first three rounds.

The tradition of choosing the tournament's "Classic Girls" from among the area's collegians began in those early years, with the earliest tournaments having a celebrity dubbed "Classic Queen". The earliest titleholders included Debbie Reynolds, Jane Powell, and Jill St. John. The queens of the 1970s included Barbara Eden and Lynda Carter.

The Classic's biggest draw, both then and now, has been the celebrity pro-am competition which has attracted some of the era's biggest celebrities. According to the official website, those celebrities have included:

- Bing Crosby
- Burt Lancaster
- Kirk Douglas
- Phil Harris
- Desi Arnaz (one of the founders of the aforementioned Indian Wells Country Club)
- Ray Bolger
- Hoagy Carmichael
- Glen Campbell
- Don Adams
- Dwight Eisenhower (the first U.S. President to play in the pro-am)

The first edition in 1960 was won by Arnold Palmer at 338 (–22), a record that stood for twenty years. He had won the last Thunderbird event the previous year, which had a $15,000 purse with a winner's share of $1,500. The purse in 1960 was over six times larger at $100,000, and the $12,000 first prize was Palmer's biggest check to date.

Hope, who was possibly Hollywood's greatest golfer, added his name to the tournament in 1965, and became its chairman of the board.

The 1970s saw stars like Frank Sinatra make their debuts. Less than three weeks out of office, Gerald Ford played his first pro-am in 1977, making him the second former president to play in the tournament. More recently celebrities such as Jimmy Fallon, Don Cheadle, and Samuel L. Jackson have competed in the Bob Hope Chrysler Classic, before its subsequent renames.

History was made at the tournament in 1995 when the pro-am team of Bill Clinton, George H. W. Bush, Gerald Ford, Bob Hope and defending champion Scott Hoch teed up for the tournament's opening round. The event marked the first time a sitting president – Clinton – had played during a PGA Tour event and perhaps the first time three presidents had ever played together.

Its long history has made the event synonymous with golf in the Coachella Valley. Additionally, the allure of Hope's name, even after his death, has convinced the Hope estate, tournament organizers and corporate sponsor Chrysler to include the legendary entertainer's name on the tournament for as long as a substantial portion of its proceeds are given to charities.

Before 2012, the tournament's five-round format was a "tough sell" for many players, such as Tiger Woods, who has never played there. It took place over five days, four of which include celebrity players. That meant rounds take far longer and the presence of so many spectators out to catch a glimpse of their favorite TV, film or music star, can turn even an early round into a far more informal endeavor, which many golfers did not enjoy.

Starting in 2012, the tournament was narrowed to a four-round event played on three courses with a 54-hole cut. The tournament is the first continental stop of the calendar year, but is still a hard sell because network television coverage of the PGA Tour starts the ensuing week.

The tournament was called the Bob Hope Chrysler Classic until the 2009 tournament, when George Lopez was let go as host and Chrysler dropped their name from the tournament's name, but continued to sponsor the tournament. Instead, the tournament was hosted by the only 5-time winner of the event, Arnold Palmer, for the tournament's 50th anniversary. In 2010, baseball Hall of Famer Yogi Berra served as the first "Classic Ambassador".

== Professional field ==
The professional field consists of 156 players selected using (slightly reordered) standard eligibility rankings except that the following are also eligible:

1. The Players Championship winners prior to 1996
2. PGA Tour members who played on the most recent Ryder Cup and Presidents Cup teams of both sides.
3. Winners of the tournament prior to 1999 and in the previous ten seasons

There is no open qualifying for the tournament. The event also reserves an exemption for the winner of the Southern California PGA Championship.

== Amateur history ==
Only three amateurs have made starts in this event: Charlie Reiter (2018, 2019, 2020), Caleb Surratt (2023), and Nick Dunlap (2024). Dunlap is the only amateur to have made the cut at the event; he won the tournament by one stroke after a 2-under final round.

== Tournament hosts ==
Venue	Years	Times
PGA West Stadium Course	1987, 2016–present	10
PGA West Nicklaus Tournament Course	2016–present	9
La Quinta Country Club	1964–1986, 1988, 1991–1992, 1994–1995, 1997–1998, 2000–2001, 2003, 2005–2008, 2010–2020, 2022–present	51
PGA West Palmer Course	1988–1994, 1998–2015	25
PGA West Nicklaus Private Course	2009–2015	7
SilverRock Resort	2008–2011	4
Bermuda Dunes	1960–2007, 2009	49
Classic Club	2006–2008	3
Indian Wells Country Club Classic Course	1960–2005	46
Tamarisk Country Club	1960–1963, 1969, 1971, 1973, 1975, 1977, 1979, 1981, 1983, 1985, 1990, 1993, 1996, 1999, 2002, 2004	19
Indian Ridge Country Club Grove Course	1995–1997	3
Eldorado Country Club	1963–1968, 1970, 1972, 1974, 1976, 1978, 1980, 1982, 1984, 1986, 1987, 1989	17
Thunderbird Country Club	1960–1962	3

== Winners ==
Year	Winner	Score	To par	Margin of victory	Runner(s)-up	Purse ($)	Winner's share ($)
The American Express
2026	(United States) Scottie Scheffler	261	−27	4 strokes	(Australia) Jason Day (United States) Ryan Gerard (United States) Matt McCarty (United States) Andrew Putnam	9,200,000	1,656,000
2025	(Austria) Sepp Straka	263	−25	2 strokes	(United States) Justin Thomas	8,800,000	1,584,000
2024	(United States) Nick Dunlap (a)	259	−29	1 stroke	(South Africa) Christiaan Bezuidenhout	8,400,000	1,512,000 (Note: As Dunlap was an amateur, he received no prize money. The winner's share was awarded to the leading professional, Christiaan Bezuidenhout.)
2023	(Spain) Jon Rahm (2)	261	−27	1 stroke	(United States) Davis Thompson	8,000,000	1,440,000
2022	(United States) Hudson Swafford (2)	265	−23	2 strokes	(United States) Tom Hoge	7,600,000	1,368,000
2021	(South Korea) Kim Si-woo	265	−23	1 stroke	(United States) Patrick Cantlay	6,700,000	1,206,000
2020	(United States) Andrew Landry	262	−26	2 strokes	(Mexico) Abraham Ancer	6,700,000	1,206,000
Desert Classic
2019	(United States) Adam Long	262	−26	1 stroke	(Canada) Adam Hadwin (United States) Phil Mickelson	5,900,000	1,062,000
CareerBuilder Challenge
2018	(Spain) Jon Rahm	266	−22	Playoff	(United States) Andrew Landry	5,900,000	1,062,000
2017	(United States) Hudson Swafford	268	−20	1 stroke	(Canada) Adam Hadwin	5,800,000	1,044,000
2016	(United States) Jason Dufner	263	−25	Playoff	(Sweden) David Lingmerth	5,800,000	1,044,000
Humana Challenge
2015	(United States) Bill Haas (2)	266	−22	1 stroke	(United States) Charley Hoffman (United States) Matt Kuchar (South Korea) Park Sung-joon (United States) Brendan Steele (United States) Steve Wheatcroft	5,700,000	1,026,000
2014	(United States) Patrick Reed	260	−28	2 strokes	(United States) Ryan Palmer	5,700,000	1,026,000
2013	(United States) Brian Gay	263	−25	Playoff	(United States) Charles Howell III (Sweden) David Lingmerth	5,600,000	1,008,000
2012	(United States) Mark Wilson	264	−24	2 strokes	(United States) Robert Garrigus (United States) John Mallinger (United States) Johnson Wagner	5,600,000	1,008,000
Bob Hope Classic
2011	(Venezuela) Jhonattan Vegas	333	−27	Playoff	(United States) Bill Haas (United States) Gary Woodland	5,000,000	900,000
2010	(United States) Bill Haas	330	−30	1 stroke	(South Africa) Tim Clark (United States) Matt Kuchar (United States) Bubba Watson	5,000,000	900,000
2009	(United States) Pat Perez	327	−33	3 strokes	(United States) John Merrick	5,100,000	918,000
Bob Hope Chrysler Classic
2008	(United States) D. J. Trahan	334	−26	3 strokes	(United States) Justin Leonard	5,100,000	918,000
2007	(United States) Charley Hoffman	343	−17	Playoff	(United States) John Rollins	5,000,000	900,000
2006	(United States) Chad Campbell	335	−25	3 strokes	(Sweden) Jesper Parnevik (United States) Scott Verplank	5,000,000	900,000
2005	(United States) Justin Leonard	332	−28	3 strokes	(South Africa) Tim Clark (United States) Joe Ogilvie	4,700,000	846,000
2004	(United States) Phil Mickelson (2)	330	−30	Playoff	(United States) Skip Kendall	4,500,000	810,000
2003	(Canada) Mike Weir	330	−30	2 strokes	(United States) Jay Haas	4,500,000	810,000
2002	(United States) Phil Mickelson	330	−30	Playoff	(United States) David Berganio Jr.	4,000,000	720,000
2001	(United States) Joe Durant	324	−36	4 strokes	(United States) Paul Stankowski	3,500,000	630,000
2000	(Sweden) Jesper Parnevik	331	−27	1 stroke	(South Africa) Rory Sabbatini	3,000,000	540,000
1999	(United States) David Duval	334	−26	1 stroke	(United States) Steve Pate	3,000,000	540,000
1998	(United States) Fred Couples	332	−28	Playoff	(United States) Bruce Lietzke	2,300,000	414,000
1997	(United States) John Cook (2)	327	−33	1 stroke	(United States) Mark Calcavecchia	1,500,000	270,000
1996	(United States) Mark Brooks	337	−23	1 stroke	(United States) John Huston	1,300,000	234,000
1995	(United States) Kenny Perry	335	−25	1 stroke	(United States) David Duval	1,200,000	216,000
1994	(United States) Scott Hoch	334	−26	3 strokes	(United States) Lennie Clements (United States) Jim Gallagher Jr. (United States) Fuzzy Zoeller	1,100,000	198,000
1993	(United States) Tom Kite	325	−35	6 strokes	(United States) Rick Fehr	1,100,000	198,000
1992	(United States) John Cook	336	−24	Playoff	(United States) Rick Fehr (United States) Tom Kite (United States) Mark O'Meara (United States) Gene Sauers	1,100,000	198,000
1991	(United States) Corey Pavin (2)	331	−29	Playoff	(United States) Mark O'Meara	1,100,000	198,000
1990	(United States) Peter Jacobsen	339	−21	1 stroke	(United States) Scott Simpson (United States) Brian Tennyson	1,000,000	180,000
1989	(United States) Steve Jones	343	−17	Playoff	(United States) Paul Azinger (Scotland) Sandy Lyle	1,000,000	180,000
1988	(United States) Jay Haas	338	−22	2 strokes	(United States) David Edwards	1,000,000	180,000
1987	(United States) Corey Pavin	341	−19	1 stroke	(West Germany) Bernhard Langer	900,000	162,000
1986	(United States) Donnie Hammond	335	−25	Playoff	(United States) John Cook	650,000	108,000
Bob Hope Classic
1985	(United States) Lanny Wadkins	333	−27	Playoff	(United States) Craig Stadler	555,000	90,000
1984	(United States) John Mahaffey (2)	340	−20	Playoff	(United States) Jim Simons	433,000	72,000
Bob Hope Desert Classic
1983	(United States) Keith Fergus	335	−25	Playoff	(United States) Rex Caldwell	408,000	67,500
1982	(United States) Ed Fiori	335	−25	Playoff	(United States) Tom Kite	304,500	50,000
1981	(United States) Bruce Lietzke	335	−25	2 strokes	(United States) Jerry Pate	304,500	50,000
1980	(United States) Craig Stadler	343	−17	2 strokes	(United States) Tom Purtzer (United States) Mike Sullivan	304,500	50,000
1979	(United States) John Mahaffey	343	−17	1 stroke	(United States) Lee Trevino	300,000	50,000
1978	(United States) Bill Rogers	339	−21	2 strokes	(United States) Jerry McGee	225,000	45,000
1977	(United States) Rik Massengale	337	−23	6 strokes	(United States) Bruce Lietzke	200,000	40,000
1976	(United States) Johnny Miller (2)	344	−16	3 strokes	(United States) Rik Massengale	180,000	36,000
1975	(United States) Johnny Miller	339	−21	3 strokes	(United States) Bob Murphy	160,000	32,000
1974	(United States) Hubert Green	341	−19	2 strokes	(United States) Bert Yancey	160,000	32,048
1973	(United States) Arnold Palmer (5)	343	−17	2 strokes	(United States) Johnny Miller (United States) Jack Nicklaus	160,000	32,000
1972	(United States) Bob Rosburg	344	−16	1 stroke	(United States) Lanny Wadkins	145,000	29,000
1971	(United States) Arnold Palmer (4)	342	−18	Playoff	(United States) Raymond Floyd	140,000	28,000
1970	(Australia) Bruce Devlin	339	−21	4 strokes	(United States) Larry Ziegler	125,000	25,000
1969	(United States) Billy Casper (2)	345	−15	3 strokes	(United States) Dave Hill	100,000	20,000
1968	(United States) Arnold Palmer (3)	348	−12	Playoff	(United States) Deane Beman	100,000	20,000
1967	(United States) Tom Nieporte	349	−11	1 stroke	(United States) Doug Sanders	88,000	17,600
1966	(United States) Doug Sanders	349	−11	Playoff	(United States) Arnold Palmer	80,000	15,000
1965	(United States) Billy Casper	348	−12	1 stroke	(United States) Tommy Aaron (United States) Arnold Palmer	80,000	15,000
Palm Springs Golf Classic
1964	(United States) Tommy Jacobs	353	−7	Playoff	(United States) Jimmy Demaret	50,000	7,500
1963	(United States) Jack Nicklaus	345	−13	Playoff	(South Africa) Gary Player	50,000	9,000
1962	(United States) Arnold Palmer (2)	342	−17	3 strokes	(United States) Jay Hebert (United States) Gene Littler	35,000	5,300
1961	(United States) Billy Maxwell	345	−14	2 strokes	(United States) Doug Sanders	52,000	5,300
Palm Springs Desert Golf Classic
1960	(United States) Arnold Palmer	338	−20	3 strokes	(United States) Fred Hawkins	70,000	12,000

Note: Green highlight indicates scoring records.

== Tournament highlights ==
- 1960: Arnold Palmer wins the inaugural version of the tournament by three shots over Fred Hawkins. Joe Campbell earned $50,000 in unofficial money for scoring a hole-in-one on the fifth hole of the Tamarisk Country Club.
- 1963: Jack Nicklaus defeats Gary Player 65 to 73 in an 18-hole playoff for the tournament title.
- 1964: 53-year-old Jimmy Demaret who rarely played competitive golf any more finishes regulation play tied for first with Tommy Jacobs but loses on the second hole of sudden death.
- 1967: Club professional Tom Nieporte birdies the 90th hole to beat Doug Sanders by one shot.
- 1972: Bob Rosburg wins for the first time since the 1961 Bing Crosby National Pro-Am. He beats Lanny Wadkins by one shot.
- 1973: Arnold Palmer wins the tournament for a fifth time by two shots over Jack Nicklaus and Johnny Miller. It is Palmer's final PGA Tour triumph.
- 1976: Johnny Miller shoots a final round 63 to successfully defend his Bob Hope title. He wins by 3 shots over Rik Massengale.
- 1980: Craig Stadler wins for the first-time on the PGA Tour. He beats Tom Purtzer and Mike Sullivan by 2 shots.
- 1982: Ed Fiori, expecting to become a first-time father any day, rolls in a 35-foot birdie putt on the second hole of a sudden death playoff to defeat Tom Kite.
- 1985: Lanny Wadkins plays the last five holes of regulation in five under par to tie Craig Stadler, then goes on to beat him on the fifth hole of a sudden death playoff.
- 1989: Steve Jones becomes the first golfer since Gil Morgan in 1983 to sweep the first two events of the PGA Tour Schedule. He defeats Paul Azinger and Sandy Lyle on the first hole of a sudden death playoff.
- 1990: Peter Jacobsen birdies the 90th hole to win the Hope by one shot over Brian Tennyson and Scott Simpson after NBC golf announcer Johnny Miller talked about how easy it would have been for Jacobsen to choke his second shot to the par-5 finishing hole.
- 1991: Corey Pavin holes a 35-foot wedge shot on the first hole of sudden death to defeat Mark O'Meara.
- 1992: John Cook holes a chip shot from 100-feet to defeat Gene Sauers in sudden death. The playoff, originally composed of five players, also involved Tom Kite, Mark O'Meara, and Rick Fehr.
- 1993: Tom Kite, who had twice previously lost the tournament in playoffs, shoots 325, a PGA Tour record for 90 holes at the time. He beats Rick Fehr by 6 shots.
- 1999: David Duval shoots a final round 59 to beat Steve Pate by one shot.
- 2001 Joe Durant shoots a record score for a 90-hole PGA tournament with a 36-under-par score of 324 (65-61-67-66-65).
- 2003: Mike Weir birdies the final three holes to win by two shots over Jay Haas.
- 2009: Pat Perez shoots 124 to set a new PGA Tour record for the first 36 holes of a tournament. He goes on to win the Hope by three shots over John Merrick.
- 2011: In just his fifth PGA Tour start and second as a Tour member, Jhonattan Vegas became the first Venezuelan to win on the PGA Tour. It was also the last year the tournament was a five-round event.
- 2014: Patrick Reed shot 63s in his first three rounds, a PGA Tour record 27-under-par for 54 holes.
- 2017: Adam Hadwin shot a 59 in the third round. He is the first Canadian on the PGA Tour to accomplish this and only the third player to shoot 59 on a par-72 course.
- 2024: Nick Dunlap becomes the first amateur to win the event and the first amateur to win on the PGA Tour since 1991.

== Records ==
- Low 18-Hole record 59 – David Duval (1999), Adam Hadwin (2017)
- Low 36-Hole record 123 – Steve Stricker (2009)
- Low 54-Hole record 189 – Patrick Reed (2014)
- Low 72-Hole record 259 – Joe Durant (2001), Nick Dunlap (2024)
- Low 90-Hole record 324 – Joe Durant (2001) (PGA Tour record)
- High winning score 349 – Doug Sanders (1966), Tom Nieporte (1967)
- High finish by winner 72 – Billy Casper (1965)
- Low finish by winner 59 – David Duval (1999)
- Low start by winner 63 – Jay Haas (1988)
- High start by winner 76 – Tom Nieporte (1967), Steve Jones (1989)
- Largest victory margin 6 strokes – Rik Massengale (1977), Tom Kite (1993)
- Low cut 273 – 15-under-par (2009) (PGA Tour record)
- Wire to wire winners – Rik Massengale (1977), Bruce Lietzke (1981)
- Best turn around – Jonathan Kaye (1999) 2nd – 83 3rd – 62

== Timeline of courses used ==
Legend:
Used in the pre-cut rota and the final round
Used only in the pre-cut rota
Used only in the final round

== Television broadcast and cable history ==
From the mid-1960s through 1998, NBC broadcast the fourth and fifth rounds of the tournament. ABC took over the coverage in 1999 through 2006, with CBS covering the tournament in 2003 due to ABC's involvement with Super Bowl XXXVII.

On the cable side, the first three rounds were covered by ESPN through 2002. From 2003–06, USA Network covered the early action.

Beginning in 2007, the tournament lost its network coverage and the Golf Channel showed all five rounds on cable television. Even with the move to four rounds and the reduction in celebrity involvement, the tournament is still exclusive to cable, as it is usually the last full-field stop restricted to cable-only coverage, as network television coverage of the PGA Tour currently does not begin until the week after the NFL's Conference Championship Games, which is two weeks before the Super Bowl.

=== Coverage style ===
Prior to 2007, the USA Network and ESPN/ABC consistently covered all four courses used for the event, with the primary camera crew covering PGA West, but live coverage still emanating from the other courses. However, when Golf Channel took over coverage, the network only assigned live coverage to PGA West (both the Palmer and Nicklaus courses). All other courses used did not receive live coverage at all, with an hourly highlights package sent in and played, but none of it live. This has been the approach consistently taken by Golf Channel in regards to tournaments with multiple courses, including the Pebble Beach National Pro-Am and the Walt Disney World Golf Classic.
