= Tamarisk Country Club =

Country club in Rancho Mirage, California

Coordinates: 33°46′23″N 116°26′15″W

Tamarisk Country Club is a private country club in Rancho Mirage, California, established in 1952. The club had 65 original members, including Jack Benny, George Burns, Danny Kaye, and the Marx Brothers. Ben Hogan was the club's first golf professional. The club hosted the Bob Hope Classic 19 times. Architect William Francis Cody designed the clubhouse. Frank Sinatra lived in a walled compound on the club's 17th fairway, and his Rat Pack friends, Sammy Davis Jr., Pat Henry, and Jilly Rizzo built homes around the corner from Sinatra.
