= Thunderbird Country Club =

Golf course

Coordinates: 33.7542°N 116.4261°W

The Thunderbird Country Club is a country club in Rancho Mirage in California's Coachella Valley. Its signature 18-hole golf course has hosted the Ryder Cup and the Palm Springs Golf Classic (now known as the American Express). Opened in 1951, the country club has been a favorite of many celebrities, including Bing Crosby and Bob Hope, as well as US Presidents Gerald Ford and Barack Obama. First known as the Thunderbird Ranch, it was purchased by Johnny Dawson, who established Coachella Valley's first 18-hole golf course here in 1951.

The golf cart is rumored to have been invented at Thunderbird Country Club. By its own account, the Ford Thunderbird is named for the club.

Its golf course was designed by Lawrence Hughes, also responsible for the 9-hole course at the Tomahawk Lake Country Club in South Dakota.
