= Rancho Mirage Library and Observatory =

Library and Observatory in Rancho Mirage, California

- Interactive map of the Rancho Mirage Library and Observatory area
- Former names: Rancho Mirage Public Library

General information
- Location: 71-100 Highway 111, Rancho Mirage, California
- Coordinates: 33°44′54″N 116°25′16″W
- Completed: January 2006 (library), March 2018 (observatory)
- Inaugurated: January 8, 2006
- Client: City of Rancho Mirage

Height
- Height: For Observatory dome only (22’6” per SeaWest Observatories)

Design and construction
- Architects: Meyer, Scherer & Rockcastle (Library); Narkweather Architects (Observatory)
- Main contractor: Sea West Enterprises (Observatory)

Website
- RanchoMirageLibrary.org

Rancho Mirage Library and Observatory is a public library and science education complex in Rancho Mirage, California. It has been called a "cultural oasis" in the Coachella Valley. Additionally, the Book Nook is a volunteer-run bookstore inside the library's building and is the last remaining book store in Rancho Mirage.

== History ==
Originally opened in 1996, the current library has operated at its present site since January 2006. The library building spans 40,000 square feet and features floor‑to‑ceiling windows offering panoramic views of the San Gorgonio and San Jacinto mountain ranges.

The library saw a three-month closure during COVID‑19, but maintained full staff pay and resumed robust programming afterward.

In April 2025, the City hosted its first-ever Earth Day Celebration on the library grounds, including e‑waste, shredding, sustainable food demos, and children’s craft stations.

== Observatory ==
The Observatory was opened on March 25, 2018, and recently celebrated its 7-year anniversary. It was funded by a “use-it-or-lose-it” state education grant, approved by the Rancho Mirage City Council, inspired by community input. It features a 22′ 6″ Ash dome housing a PlaneWave CDK‑700 research‑grade telescope with remote-control capability. The Library and Observatory hosts regular viewing parties and daytime observatory tours. And regular free OPENights (Observatory Public Exploration Nights) are held every Thursday and Saturday, with no registration required. Daytime Tours are held Tuesdays–Thursdays at 3pm, with family-focused tours on Saturdays, all free and open to all ages. The Library Telescope Program allows library members to check out portable Orion Star Blast telescopes (around 30 in the collection) for personal use.

== Rancho Mirage Writers Festival ==
The Rancho Mirage Writers Festival is an annual literary festival held at the library since 2014. Founded by Jamie Kabler, the three-day event typically takes place in late January or early February and attracts approximately 60 authors and 1,000 attendees from around the world.

The festival features over 70 sessions with authors, journalists, historians, and political figures, including multiple Pulitzer Prize winners. Past participants have included Jon Meacham, Doris Kearns Goodwin, Anthony Doerr, political figures such as Barbara Boxer and James Carville, and other notable authors like Dave Barry, Fran Lebowitz, James Patterson, George Saunders, Zadie Smith, Jerry Brown, Sally Field, Tom Hanks and Mike Reiss. Due to the library's capacity constraints, the festival is limited to approximately 1,100 attendees, and tickets typically sell out within minutes of going on sale.

The festival has been described by Pulitzer Prize-winning author A. Scott Berg as "possibly the greatest book festival in America." In addition to the main annual festival, the library hosts the Writers Series throughout the year, featuring talks by prominent authors.

== In popular culture ==
The Rancho Mirage Library and Observatory was featured as a stargazing date location in the 18th season of The Bachelorette.
