= Mid-century modern =

Design movement of the mid-20th century

Mid-century modern architecture
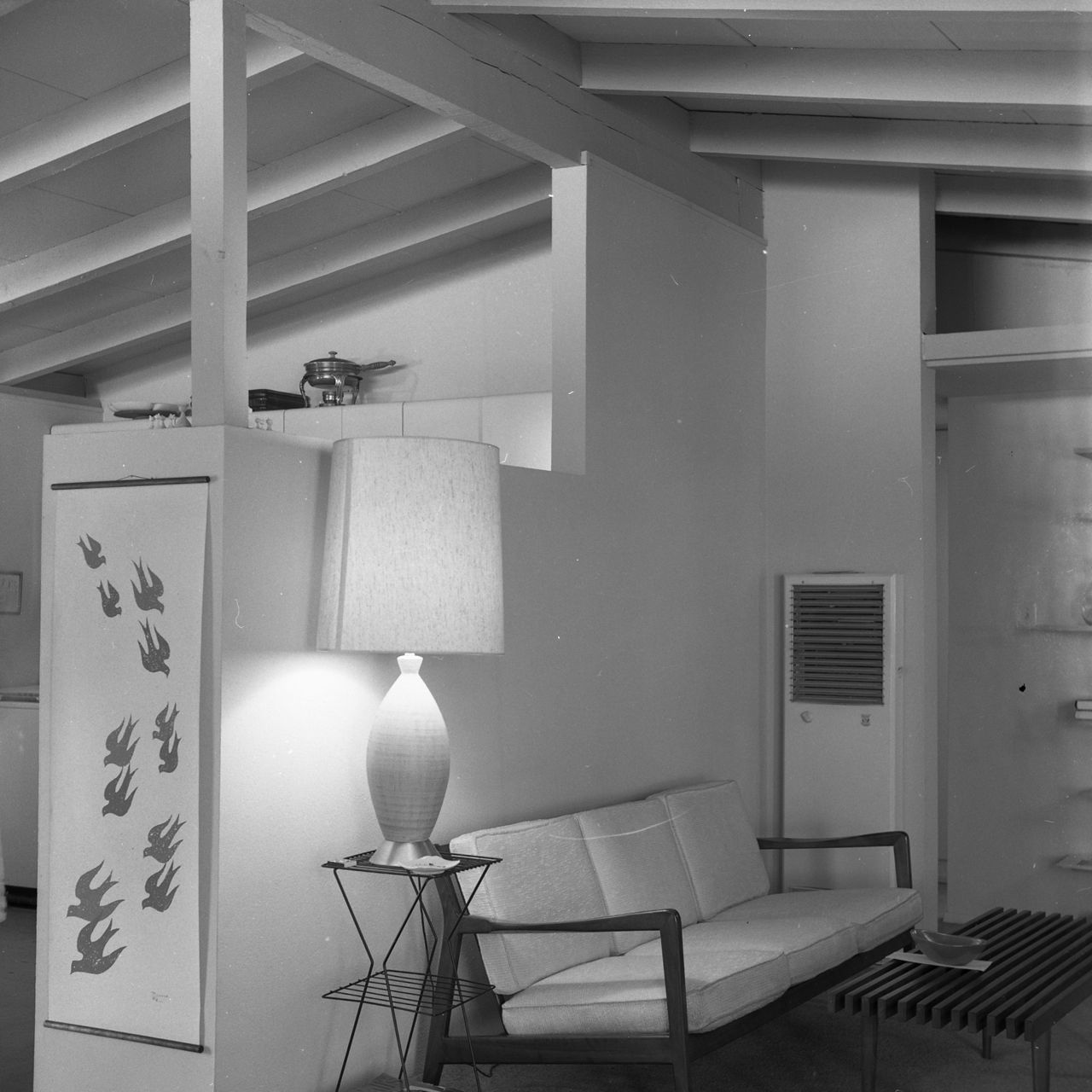
- Tract house in Tujunga, California, featuring open-beamed ceilings, c. 1960

Additional media
- Years active: 1945–1970s
- Location: All the world. Mainly in North America, Brazil, Europe, Japan, Singapore, South Korea, and Taiwan
- Influences: International, Bauhaus

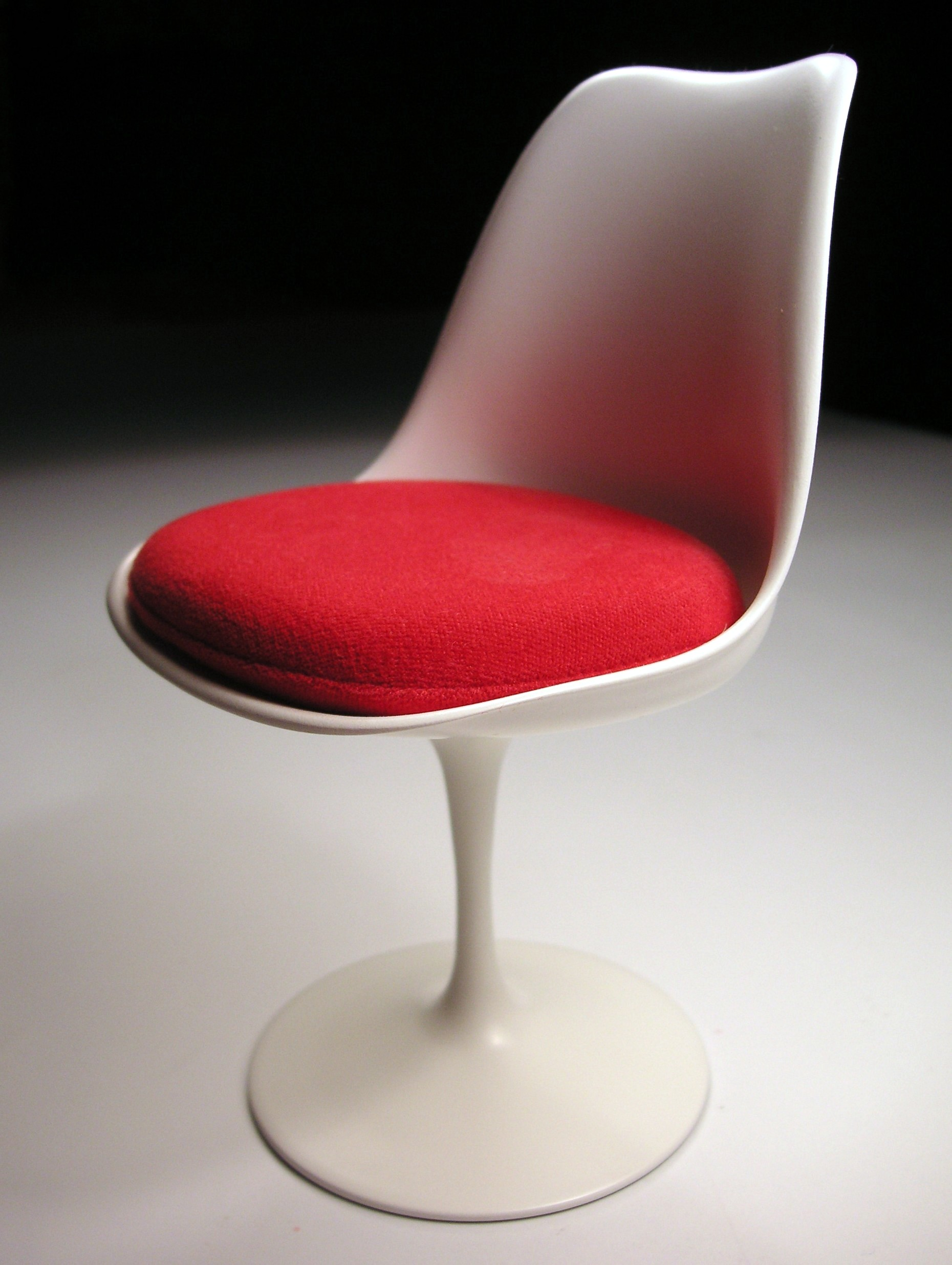
Tulip chair by Eero Saarinen

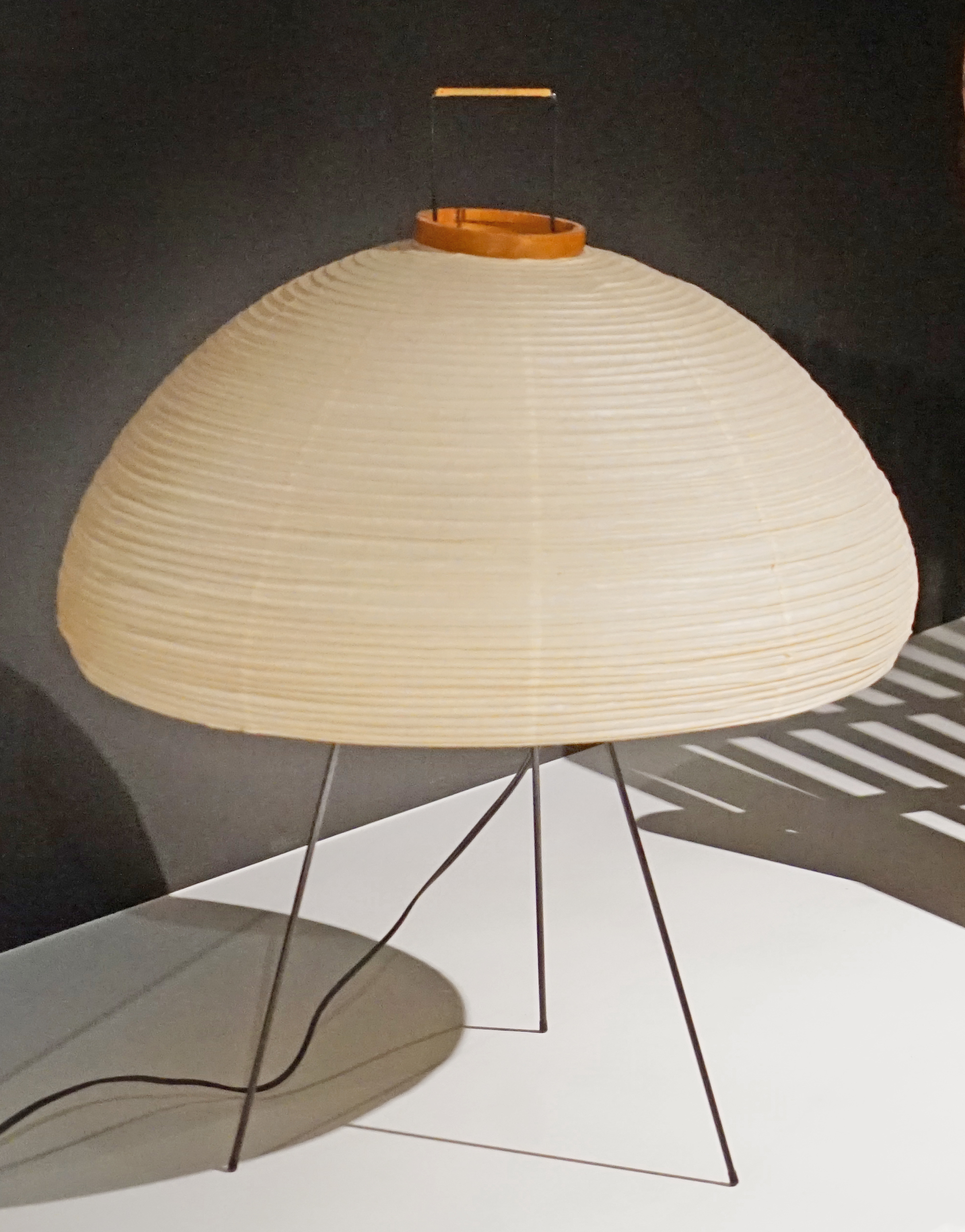
Akari light sculpture Model 10A by Isamu Noguchi

Mid-century modern (MCM) is "a style of design popular in the mid-twentieth century, characterized by clean, simple lines and lack of embellishment." The style was present throughout the world but gained most popularity in North America, Brazil and Europe from roughly 1945 to 1970. MCM style can be seen in interior design, product design, graphic design, architecture and urban development.

MCM-style decor and architecture have seen a major resurgence that began in the late 1990s and continues today.

The term was used as early as the mid-1950s, and was defined as a design movement by Cara Greenberg in her 1984 book Mid-Century Modern: Furniture of the 1950s. It is now recognized by scholars and museums worldwide as a significant design movement.

The MCM design aesthetic is modern in style and construction, aligned with the modernist movement of the period. It is typically characterized by clean, simple lines and honest use of materials, and generally does not include decorative embellishments.

On the exterior, an MCM home is normally very wide, partially brick or glass walls, low footprints with floor to ceiling windows and flat rooflines, while exposed ceilings and beams, open floor plans, ergonomically designed furniture and short staircases connecting rooms throughout the house often define the home's interior.

== Architecture ==
Frank Sinatra's Twin Palms house in Palm Springs designed by E. Stewart Williams

The mid-century modern movement in the U.S. was an American reflection of the International and Bauhaus movements, including the works of Gropius, Florence Knoll, Le Corbusier, and Ludwig Mies van der Rohe. Although the American component was slightly more organic in form and less formal than the International Style, it is more firmly related to it than any other.

Brazilian and Scandinavian architects were very influential at this time, with a style characterized by clean simplicity and integration with nature. Like many of Frank Lloyd Wright's designs, mid-century architecture was frequently employed in residential structures with the goal of bringing modernism into America's post-war suburbs.

This style emphasized creating structures with ample windows and open floor plans, with the intention of opening up interior spaces and bringing the outdoors in. Many mid-century houses utilized then-groundbreaking post and beam architectural design that eliminated bulky support walls in favor of walls seemingly made of glass. Function was as important as form in mid-century designs, with an emphasis placed on targeting the needs of the average American family.

In Europe, the influence of Le Corbusier and the Congrès International d'Architecture Moderne resulted in an architectural orthodoxy manifest across most parts of post-war Europe that was ultimately challenged by the radical agendas of the architectural wings of the avant-garde Situationist International, COBRA, as well as Archigram in London.

A critical but sympathetic reappraisal of the internationalist oeuvre, inspired by Scandinavian Moderns such as Alvar Aalto, Sigurd Lewerentz and Arne Jacobsen and by the late work of Le Corbusier himself, was reinterpreted by groups such as Team X, including structuralist architects such as Aldo van Eyck, Ralph Erskine, Denys Lasdun, and Jørn Utzon and the movement known in the United Kingdom as New Brutalism.

Pioneering builder and real estate developer Joseph Eichler was instrumental in bringing mid-century modern architecture ("Eichler Homes") to subdivisions in the Los Angeles area and the San Francisco Bay region of California, and select housing developments on the east coast.

George Fred Keck, his brother William Keck, Henry P. Glass, Mies van der Rohe, and Edward Humrich created mid-century modern residences in the Chicago area. Mies van der Rohe's Farnsworth House is extremely difficult to heat or cool, while Keck and Keck were pioneers in the incorporation of passive solar features in their houses to compensate for their large glass windows.

=== Mid-century modern in the United States ===
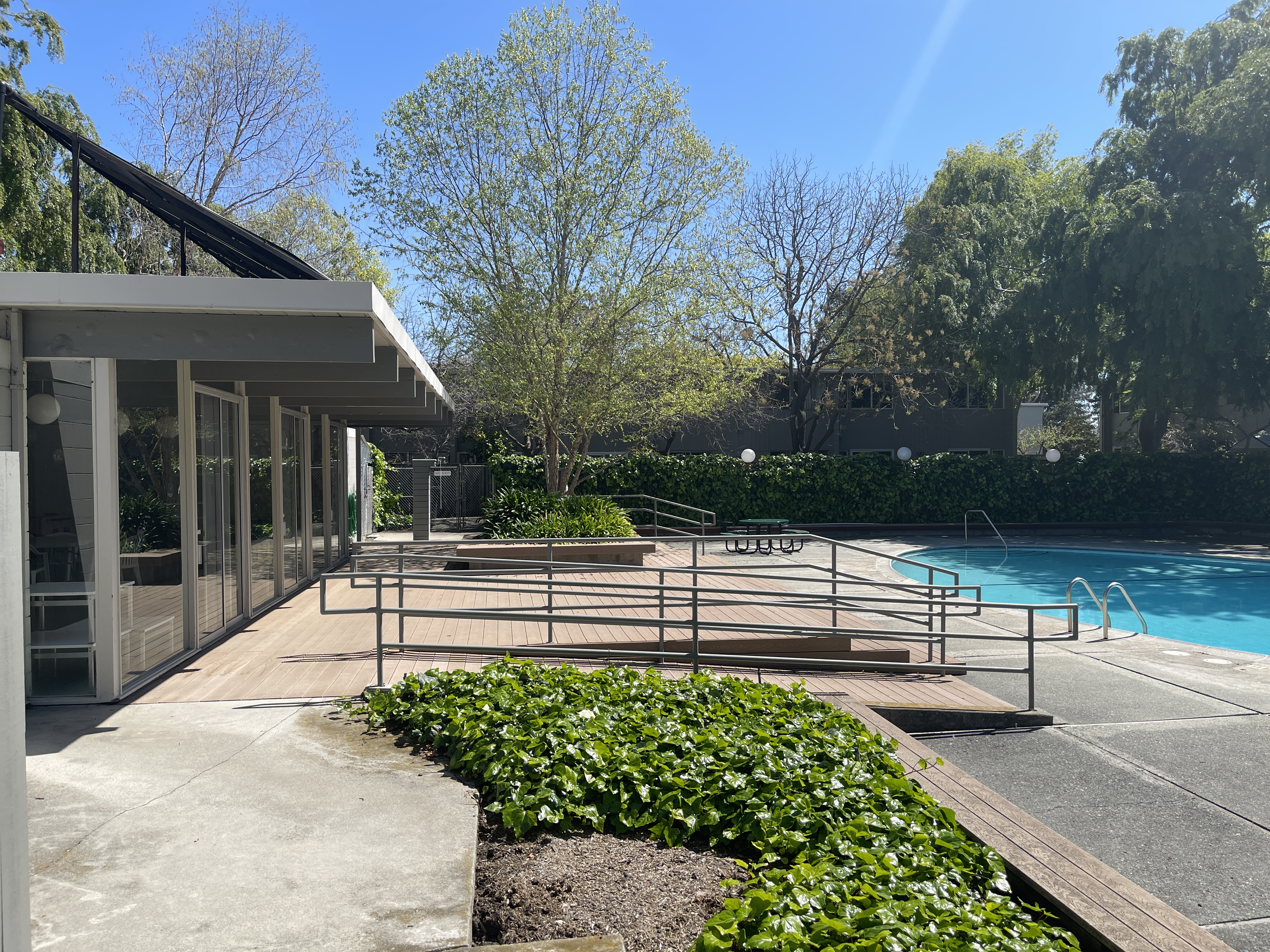
Eichler Homes – Foster Residence, Santa Clara

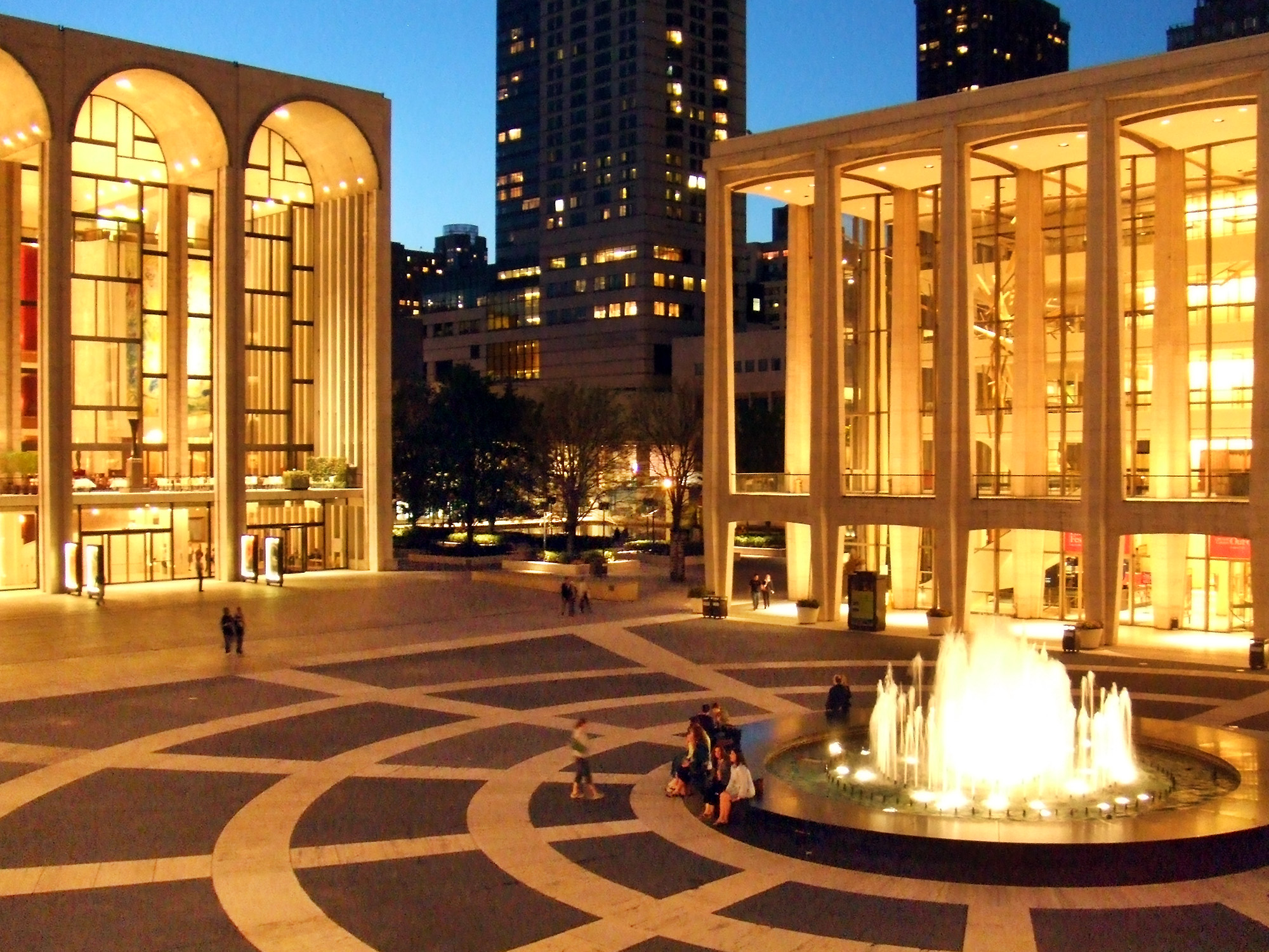
Lincoln Center, New York City

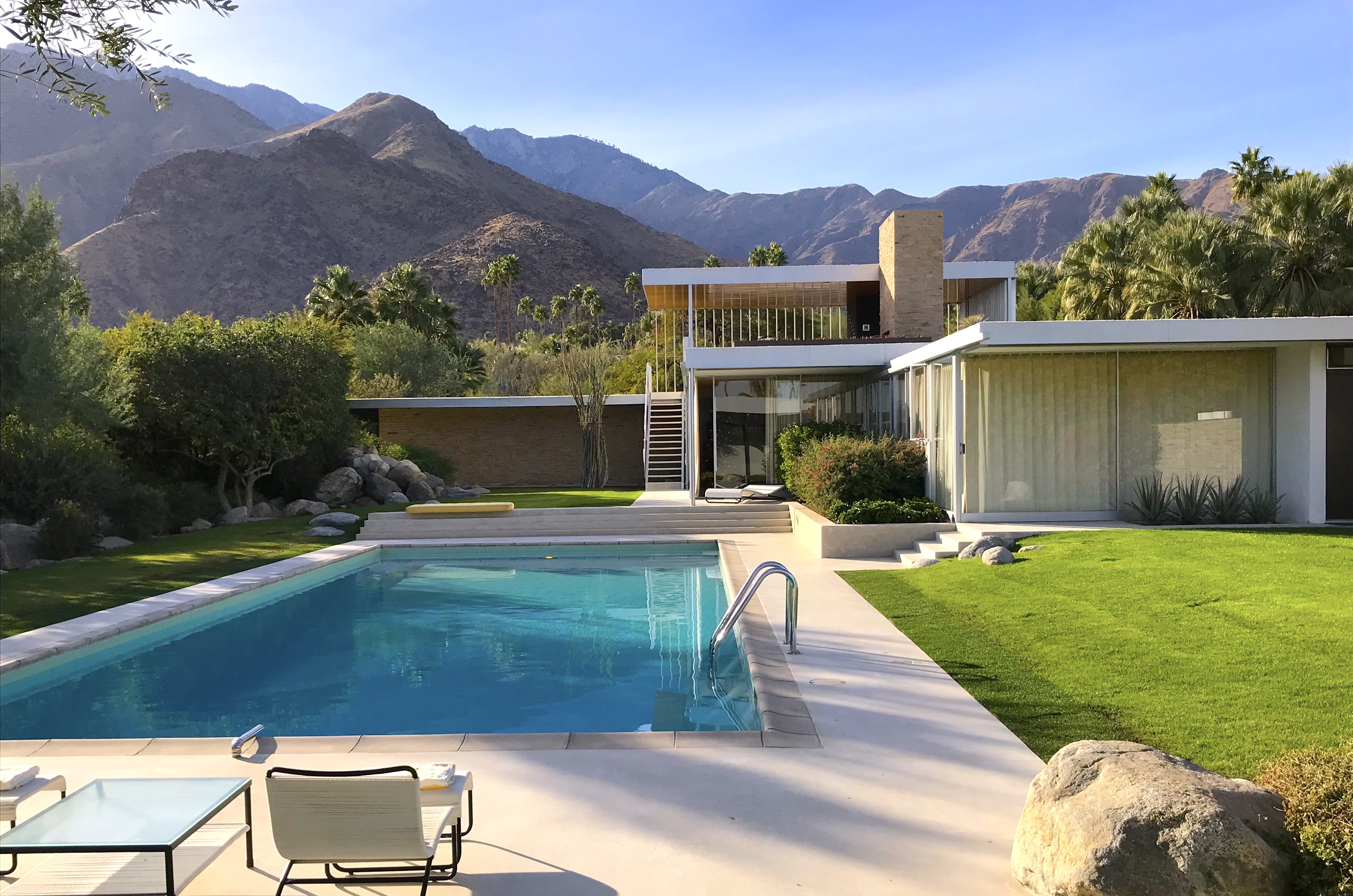
Kaufmann Desert House, by Richard Neutra, in Palm Springs

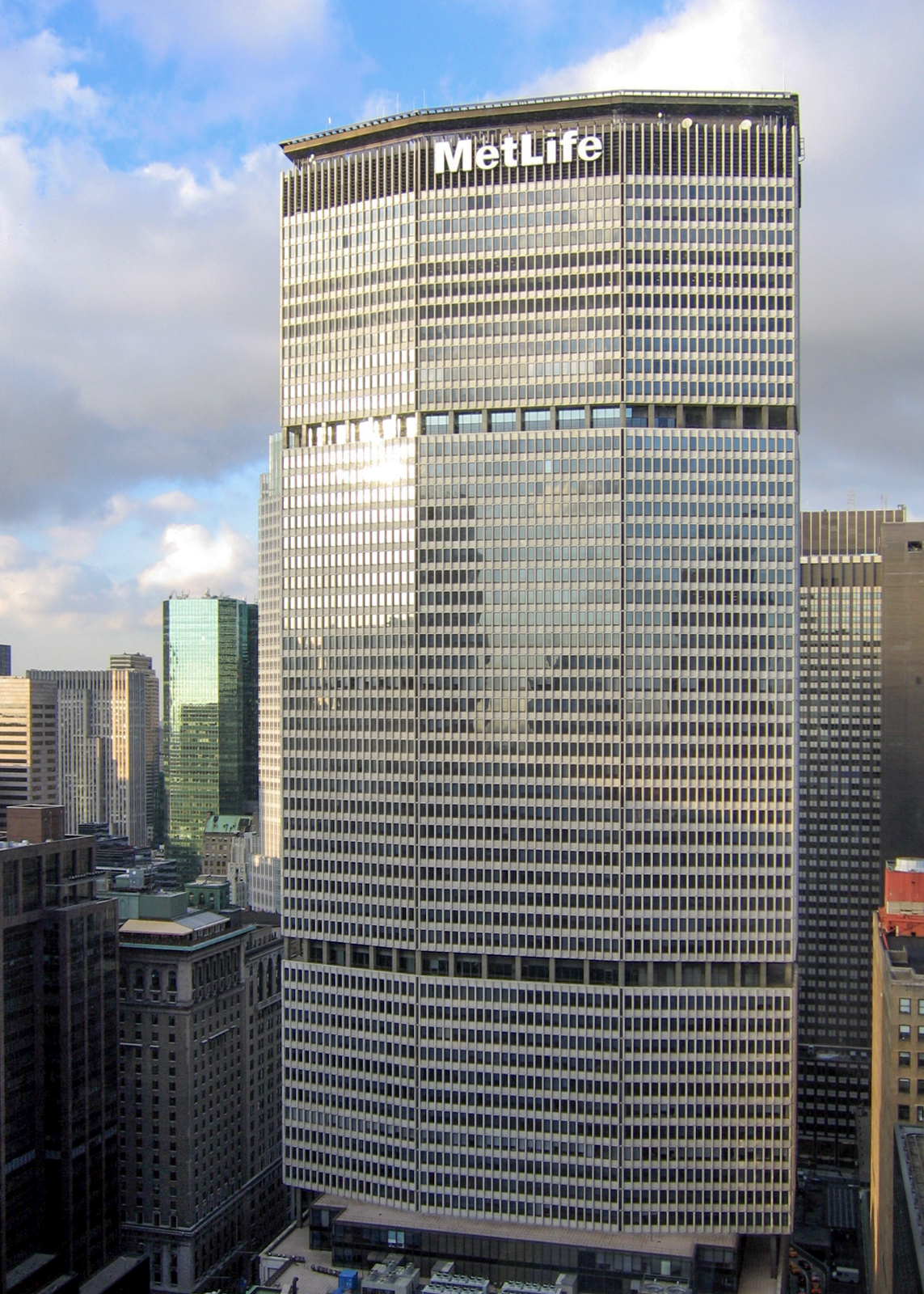
MetLife Building (formerly Pan Am Building), in New York City, designed by Richard Roth, Walter Gropius, and Pietro Belluschi

Many European designers moved to the United States during the 1930s and the 1940s, including Walter Gropius, Mies van der Rohe, and Eliel Saarinen. These designers played a large role in shaping American mid-century modern interior design. They believed that well-designed environments could have a positive influence on behavior and quality of life. Their contributions helped move interior design away from decorative traditions and to a more intentional approach.

The 1954 "Design in Scandinavia" exhibit at the Brooklyn Museum helped bring Scandinavian modern design to the U.S. Around that time, it started to mix with mid-century modern, a style that became popular in the 1950s. Mid-century modern was America's way of moving away from older, fancy styles and was part of a bigger modern design movement. Contemporary furniture retailers, such as Modern Miami Furniture, have continued to promote mid-century modern and modern designs, offering a variety of mid-century inspired products online and in showrooms.

Thomas Hines talks about how after World War II, American companies started making products that looked sleek and futuristic, inspired by space and military technology. These modern designs became a sign that the country was entering a new chapter. Promoting this style was not just about the updated look, but it was also a way to encourage consumers to buy to help the economy grow.

Palm Springs, California, is a city noted for its many examples of mid-century modern architecture.

Architects include:

- Welton Becket: Bullock's Palm Springs (with Wurdeman) (1947) (demolished, 1996)
- John Porter Clark: Welwood Murray Library (1937); Clark Residence (1939) (on the El Minador golf course); Palm Springs Women's Club (1939)
- William F. Cody: Stanley Goldberg residence; Del Marcos Motel (1947); L'Horizon Hotel, for Jack Wrather and Bonita Granville (1952); remodel of Thunderbird Country Club clubhouse (c. 1953) (Rancho Mirage); Tamarisk Country Club (1953) (Rancho Mirage) (now remodeled); Huddle Springs restaurant (1957); St. Theresa Parish Church (1968); Palm Springs Library (1975)
- Craig Ellwood: Max Palevsky House (1970)
- Albert Frey: Palm Springs City Hall (with Clark and Chambers) (1952–57); Palm Springs Fire Station #1 (1955); Tramway Gas Station (1963); Movie Colony Hotel; Kocher-Samson Building (1934) (with A. Lawrence Kocher); Raymond Loewy House (1946); Villa Hermosa Resort (1946); Frey House I (1953); Frey House II (1963); Carey-Pirozzi house (1956); Christian Scientist Church (1957); Alpha Beta Shopping Center (1960) (demolished)
- Victor Gruen: City National Bank (now Bank of America) (1959) (designed as an homage to the Chapelle Notre Dame du Haut, Ronchamp, by Le Corbusier)
- A. Quincy Jones: Palm Springs Tennis Club (with Paul R. Williams) (1946); Town & Country Center (with Paul R. Williams) (1947–50); J.J. Robinson House (with Frederick E. Emmons) (1957); Ambassador and Mrs. Walter H. Annenberg House (with Frederick E. Emmons) (1963); Country Club Estates Condominiums (1965)
- William Krisel: Ocotillo Lodge(1957); House of Tomorrow(1962).
- John Lautner: Desert Hot Springs Motel (1947); Arthur Elrod House (1968) (interiors used in filming James Bond's Diamonds Are Forever); Hope Residence (1973)
- John Black Lee: Specialized in residential houses. Lee House 1 (1952), Lee House 2 (1956) for which he won the Award of Merit from the American Institute of Architects, Day House (1965), * System House (1961), Rogers House (1957), Ravello (1960)
- Gene Leedy: The Sarasota School of Architecture, sometimes called Sarasota Modern, is a regional style of post-war architecture that emerged on Florida's Central West Coast.
- Frederick Monhoff: Palm Springs Biltmore Resort (1948) (demolished, 2003)
- John Lingwood: (1923–1996), active architect from 1955 to 1996. John Lingwood was a Canadian architect, and one of Waterloo (Ontario) region's most influential architects. Lingwood, along with his firm, designed over 700 buildings. One of Lingwood's most prominent works is the "Shantz House".
- Richard Neutra (Posthumous AIA Gold Medal honoree): Grace Lewis Miller house (1937) (includes her Mensendlieck posture therapy studio); Kaufmann Desert House (1946); Samuel and Luella Maslon House, Tamarisk Country Club, Rancho Mirage (1962) (demolished 2003)
- William Pereira: Robinson's (1953)
- William Gray Purcell (with protégé Van Evera Bailey): Purcell House (1933) (cubist modern)
- Donald Wexler and Richard Harrison: Steel Developmental Houses, Sunny View Drive (1961). Home developer, Alexander Homes, popularized this post-and-beam architectural style in the Coachella Valley. Alexander houses and similar homes feature low-pitched roofs, wide eaves, open-beamed ceilings, and floor-to-ceiling windows.
- E. Stewart Williams: Frank Sinatra House (1946) (with piano-shaped pool); Oasis commercial building (with interiors by Paul R. Williams) (1952); William and Marjorie Edris House (1954); Mari and Steward Williams House (1956); Santa Fe Federal Savings Building (1958); Coachella Valley Savings & Loan (now Washington Mutual) (1960); Palm Springs Desert Museum (1976)
- Paul Williams: Palm Springs Tennis Club (with Jones) (1946)
- Frank Lloyd Wright Jr.: Oasis Hotel (1923)
- Walter Wurdeman: Bullock's Palm Springs (with Welton Becket) (1947) (demolished 1996)

Examples of 1950s Palm Springs motel architecture include Ballantines Movie Colony (1952) – one portion is the 1935 Albert Frey San Jacinto Hotel – the Coral Sands Inn (1952), and the Orbit Inn (1957). Restoration projects have been undertaken to return many of these residences and businesses to their original condition.

In nearby Newberry Springs, Harold James Bissner Jr designed the 1968 circular "space-age" Volcano House (1968–1969)

=== Mid-Century modern in Brazil ===
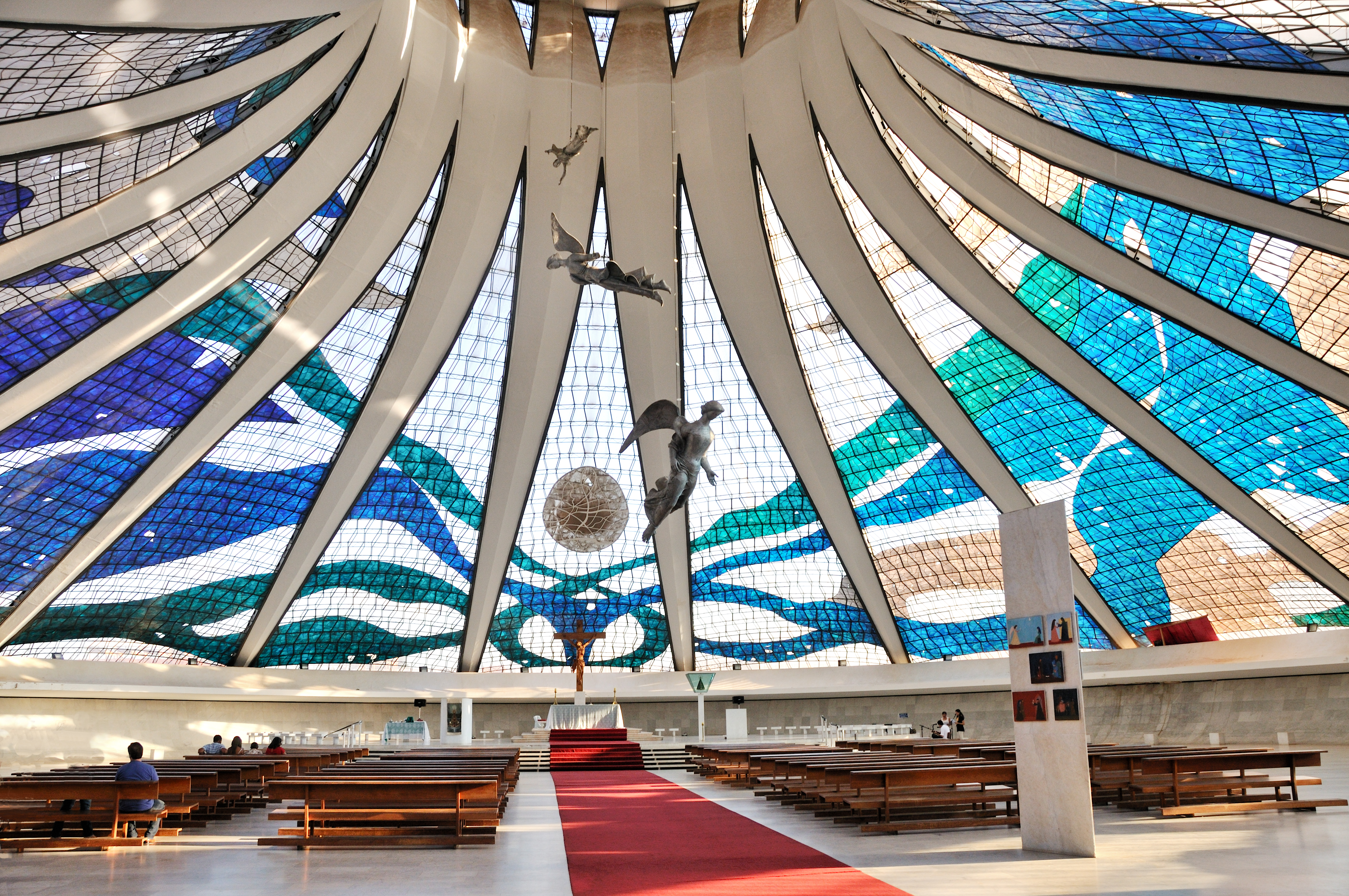
Cathedral of Brasília, by Oscar Niemeyer, in the Brazilian federal capital Brasília

Brazil is the only country in the world where an entire city, and in this case the country's capital, Brasília, was built entirely in the mid-century modern style. The city was inaugurated in 1961 and is the third most populous city in the country, behind only São Paulo and Rio de Janeiro. In addition to the memorable buildings by architect Oscar Niemeyer, there are also works by Athos Bulcão, Marianne Peretti, João Filgueiras Lima and landscaping by Burle Marx.

Architects include:

- Lucio Costa: major achievements include the Gustavo Capanema Palace in Rio de Janeiro and the famous Pacaembu Stadium in São Paulo.
- Vilanova Artigas: major achievements include Faculty of Architecture and Urbanism, University of São Paulo and Morumbi Stadium, both in São Paulo.
- Oscar Niemeyer: major achievements include National Congress of Brazil, Alvorada Palace Presidential Residence, Cathedral of Brasília, Supreme Court of Brazil, Planalto Palace – Official Workplace of the President of Brazil, Itamaraty Palace – Ministry of Foreign Affairs of Brazil, Cláudio Santoro National Theater, Superior Court of Justice, all in Brasília. Ibirapuera Park in São Paulo. Niterói Contemporary Art Museum, Manchete Building, Casa das Canoas, in Rio de Janeiro. Oscar Niemeyer Museum in Curitiba.
- Lina Bo Bardi: major achievements include São Paulo Museum of Art and Casa de Vidro, both in São Paulo.
- Paulo Mendes da Rocha: major achievement includes São Paulo State Art Gallery in São Paulo.

=== Mid-Century modern in Europe ===
Scandinavian design had a great influence on the mid-century modern furniture. The style is characterized by a minimalist, clean-lined approach that looks to combine functionality with beauty, well-crafted, classic, and timeless. Emphasis is put on utilizing natural materials to improve daily life through unique, purposeful design, durability and reliability. The Scandinavian mid-century modern goal was to minimize, promoting quality over quantity and cozy togetherness. The Nordic style united innovation, simplicity, and elegance. Scandinavian modern designers, such as Børge Mogensen, Hans Wegner, Finn Juhl, Arne Vodder, Verner Panton, and Alvar Aalto, stood out in this movement.

In 1930, the Stockholm Exhibition introduced a new type of design to Scandinavia, focusing on clean shapes, simple lines, and practical use. This exhibition was led by Gregor Paulsson, and the event showcased buildings and furniture that were practical and stylish without extra decoration. This exhibition influenced many designers across Europe, and helped spread the ideas that now define mid-century modern design.

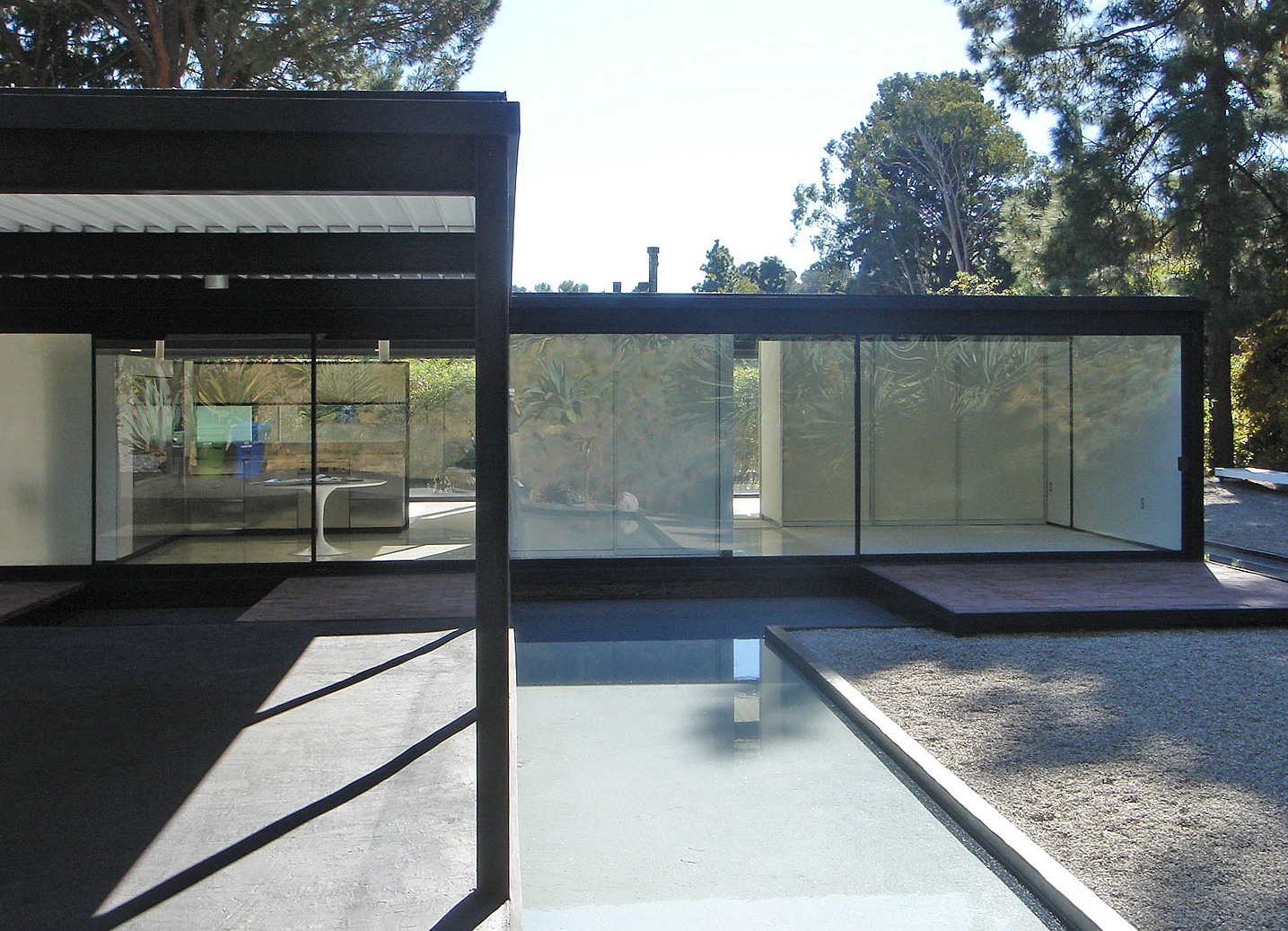
Bailey House, Case Study House 21, Los Angeles

=== Case Study Houses ===
The Case Study Houses program ran from 1945 to 1966 and was an experimental initiative intended to address the housing boom after World War II in the United States. It brought together some of the most significant mid-century modern architects, including Charles and Ray Eames, Craig Ellwood, A. Quincy Jones, Edward Killingsworth, Pierre Koenig, Richard Neutra, Ralph Rapson, Eero Saarinen, and Raphael Soriano to design and construct efficient, affordable prototype homes. These houses served as models for modern residential living and were documented by architectural photographer Julius Shulman.

Between the 1940s to 1990s, many homes gained widespread recognition for their MCM architectural design, with many becoming immortalized in film and other media.

Pierre Koenig's Case Study House #22 - Built in 1960, located in Los Angeles, California. Highly notable for its appearances in television and media.

Louis Khan's Fisher House - Built in 1960, located in Hatboro, Pennsylvania. Renowned for its play of light, achieved through its strategically placed windows and skylights throughout the home.

Jeff Kovel's Hoke House also known as the iconic "Twilight house". Built in 2007, in Portland, Oregon. The home was commissioned for the Nike executive John Hoke, who purchased the home just days after its completion. Consisting of a 14-foor cantilevered section, floor to ceiling glass walls and cedar cladding, it perfectly contains that mix of MCM modern and existing Oregon property designs.

== Industrial design ==
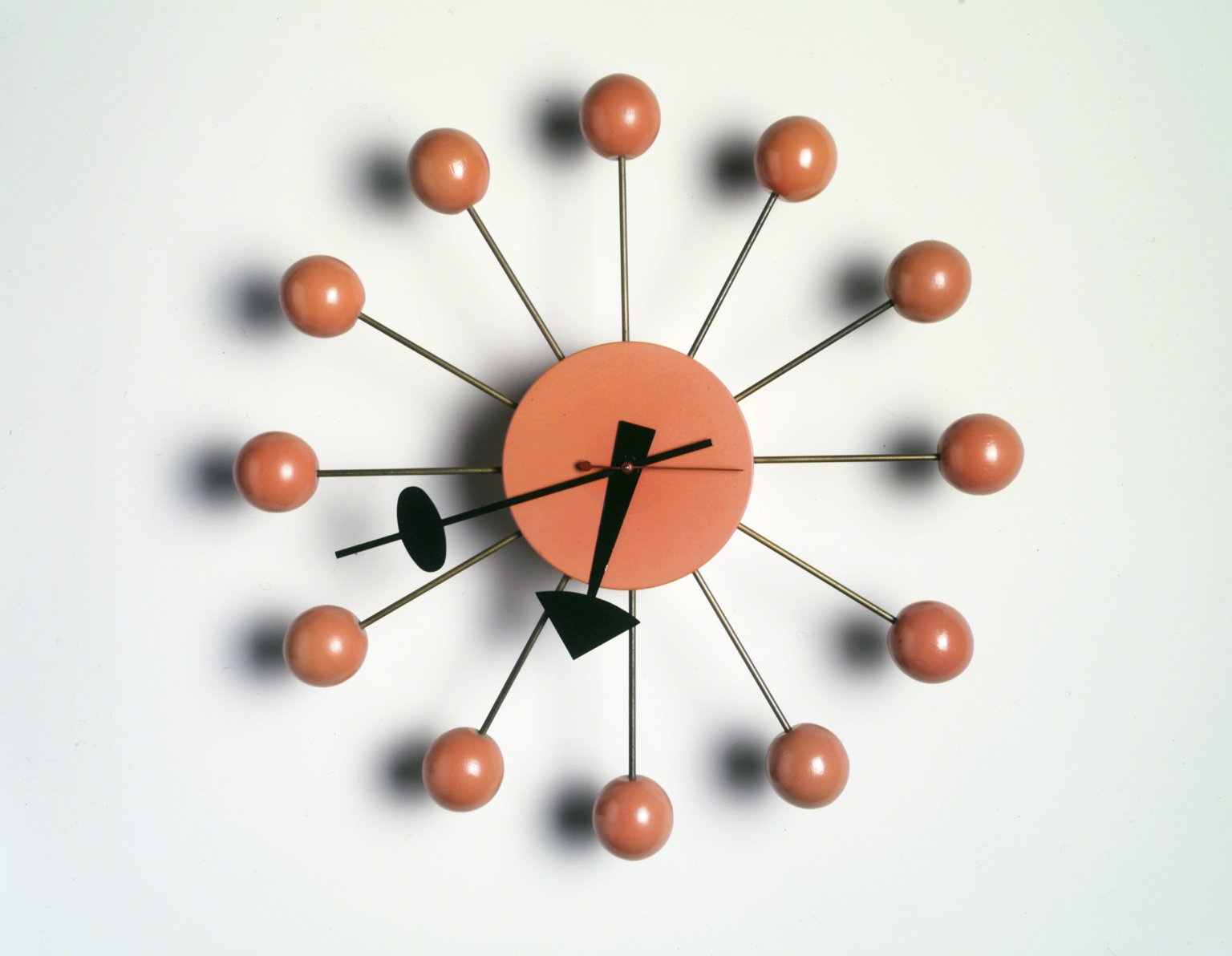
Ball wall clock by George Nelson

Scandinavian design was very influential at this time, with a style characterized by simplicity, democratic design and natural shapes. Glassware (Iittala – Finland), ceramics (Arabia – Finland), tableware (Georg Jensen – Denmark), lighting (Poul Henningsen – Denmark), and furniture (Danish modern) were some of the genres for the products created.

In the eastern United States, the American-born Russel Wright and Mary Wright, designing for Steubenville Pottery, and Hungarian-born Eva Zeisel designing for Red Wing Pottery and later Hall China created free-flowing ceramic designs that were much admired and heralded in the trend of smooth, flowing contours in dinnerware.

On the West Coast of the United States, the industrial designer and potter Edith Heath (1911–2005) founded Heath Ceramics in 1948. The company was one of the numerous California pottery manufacturers that had their heyday in post-war United States, and produced mid-Century modern ceramic dish-ware.

In New Mexico, Nambé Mills, Inc. in 1953 introduced a range of cast and polished alloy tableware and cookware of modernist design, with the luster of silver and the solidity of iron, some of which items are still within the product range. Sales are largely through retail stores in New Mexico and Arizona, and through upmarket national retailers. Portmeirion Group purchased Nambé in 2019. As a subsidiary of Portmeirion, it now trades as Nambé International.

Edith Heath's "Coupe" line remains in demand and has been in constant production since 1948, with only periodic changes to the texture and color of the glazes.

The Tamac Pottery company produced a line of mid-century modern biomorphic dinnerware and housewares between 1946 and 1972.

== Social medium ==
Printed ephemera documenting the mid-century transformations in design, architecture, landscape, infrastructure, and entertainment include mid-century linen post cards from the early 1930s to the late 1950s. These post cards came about through innovations pioneered through the use of offset lithography. The cards were produced on paper with a high rag content, which gave the post card a textured look and feel. At the time this was a less expensive process.

Along with advances in printing technique, mid-century linen postcards allowed for very vibrant ink colors. The encyclopedic geographic imagery of mid-century linen post cards suggests popular middle-class attitudes about nature, wilderness, technology, mobility and the city during the mid-20th century.

Curt Teich in Chicago was the most prominent and largest printer and publisher of Linen Type postcards pioneering lithography with his "Art Colortone" process.

Other large publishers include Stanley Piltz in San Francisco, who established the "Pictorial Wonderland Art Tone Series", Western Publishing and Novelty Company in Los Angeles and the Tichnor Brothers in Boston. The printing of mid-century linen post cards began to give way in the late 1950s to Kodachrome and Ektachrome color prints.

== Examples ==
=== Architecture ===
==== Commercial ====
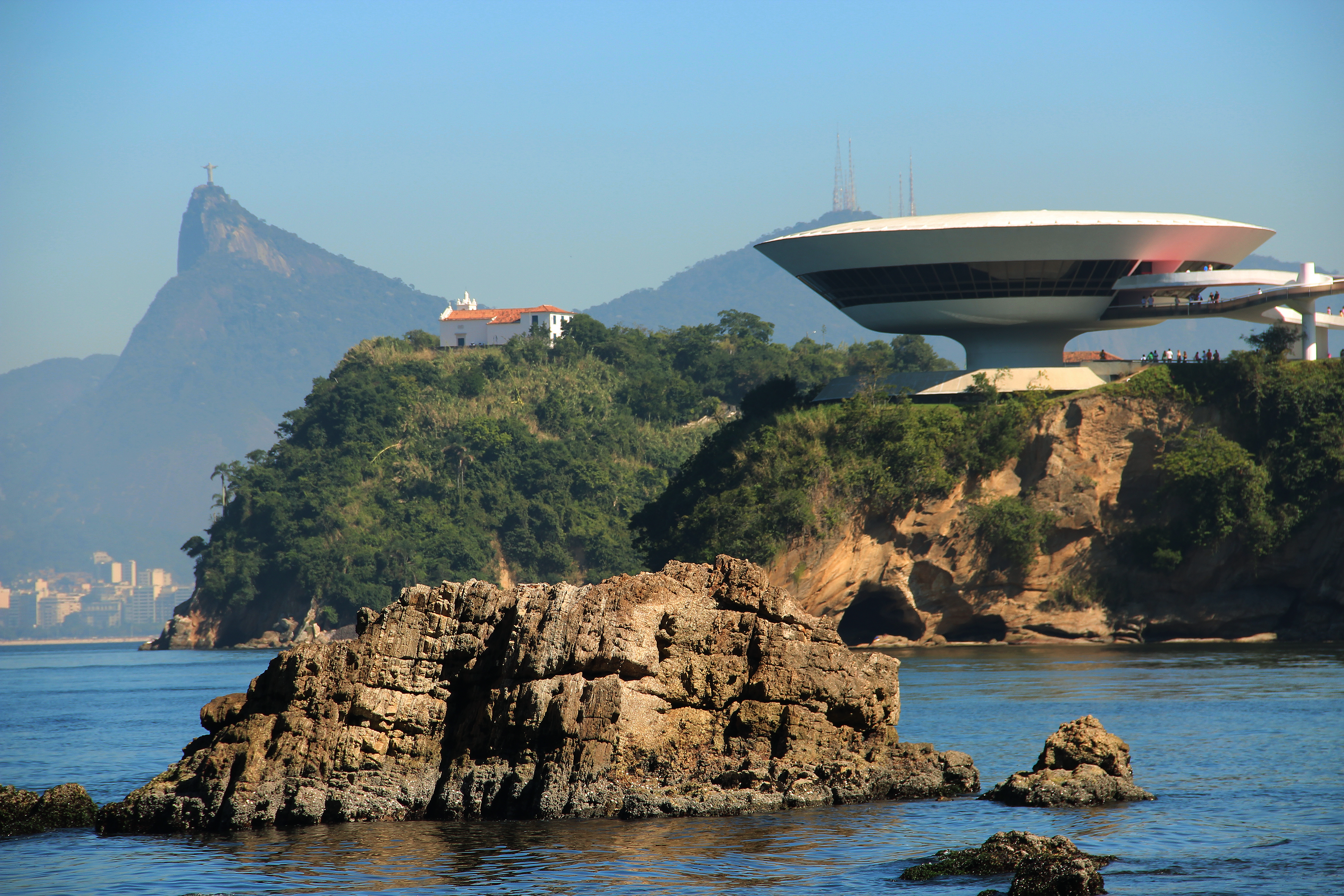
Oscar Niemeyer's Contemporary Art Museum in Niteroi

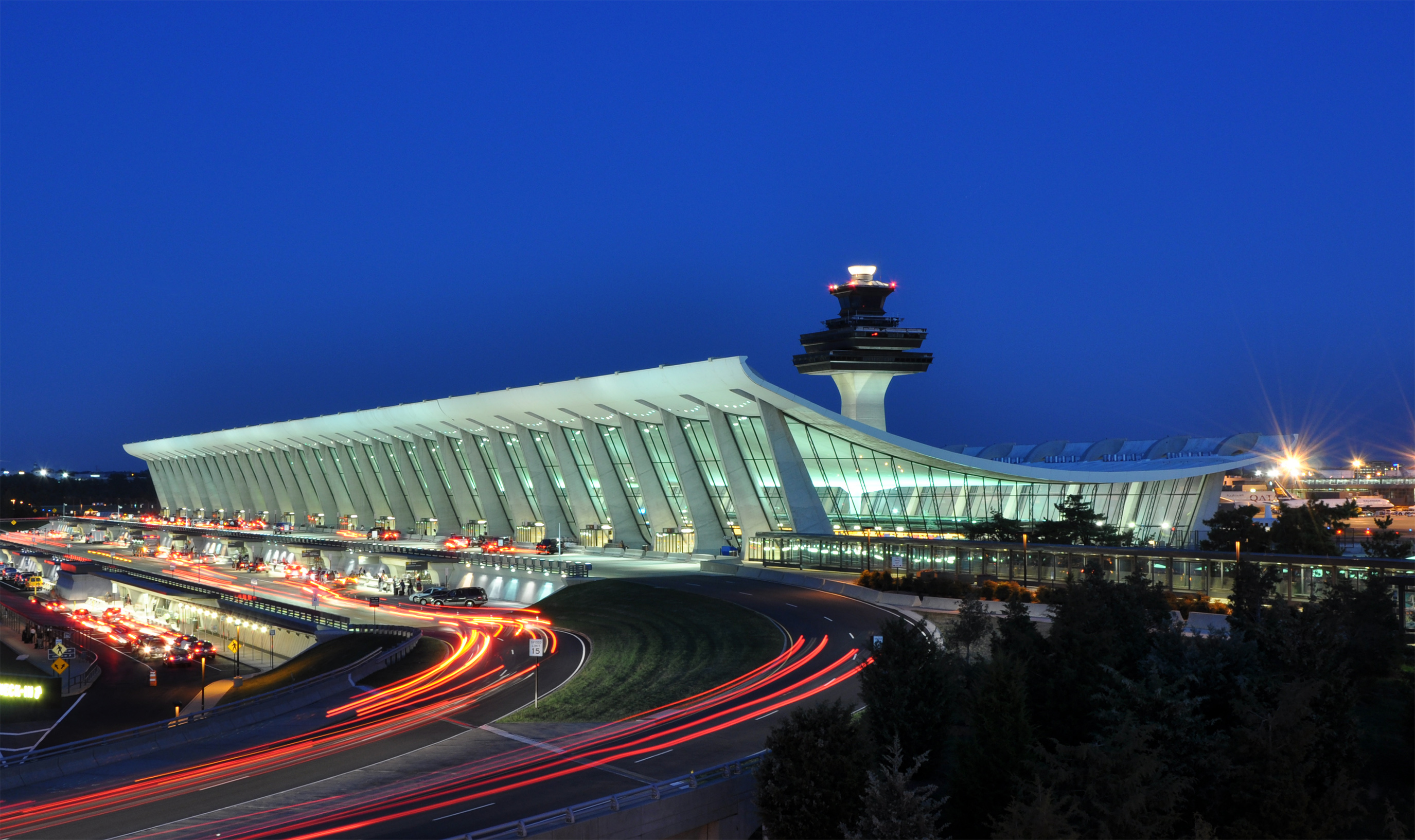
Main Terminal at Dulles Airport in Northern Virginia by Eero Saarinen

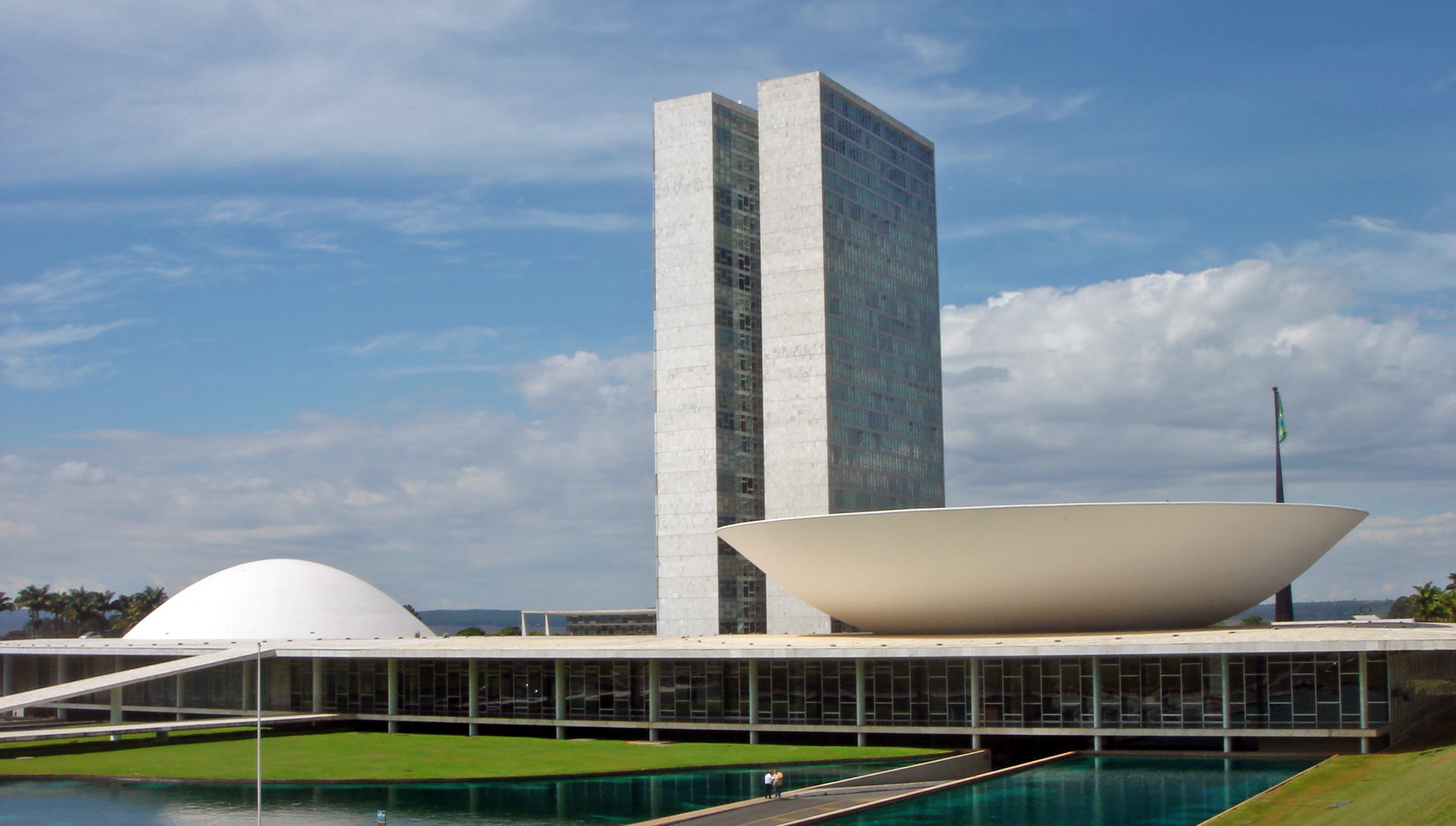
National Congress of Brazil by Oscar Niemeyer

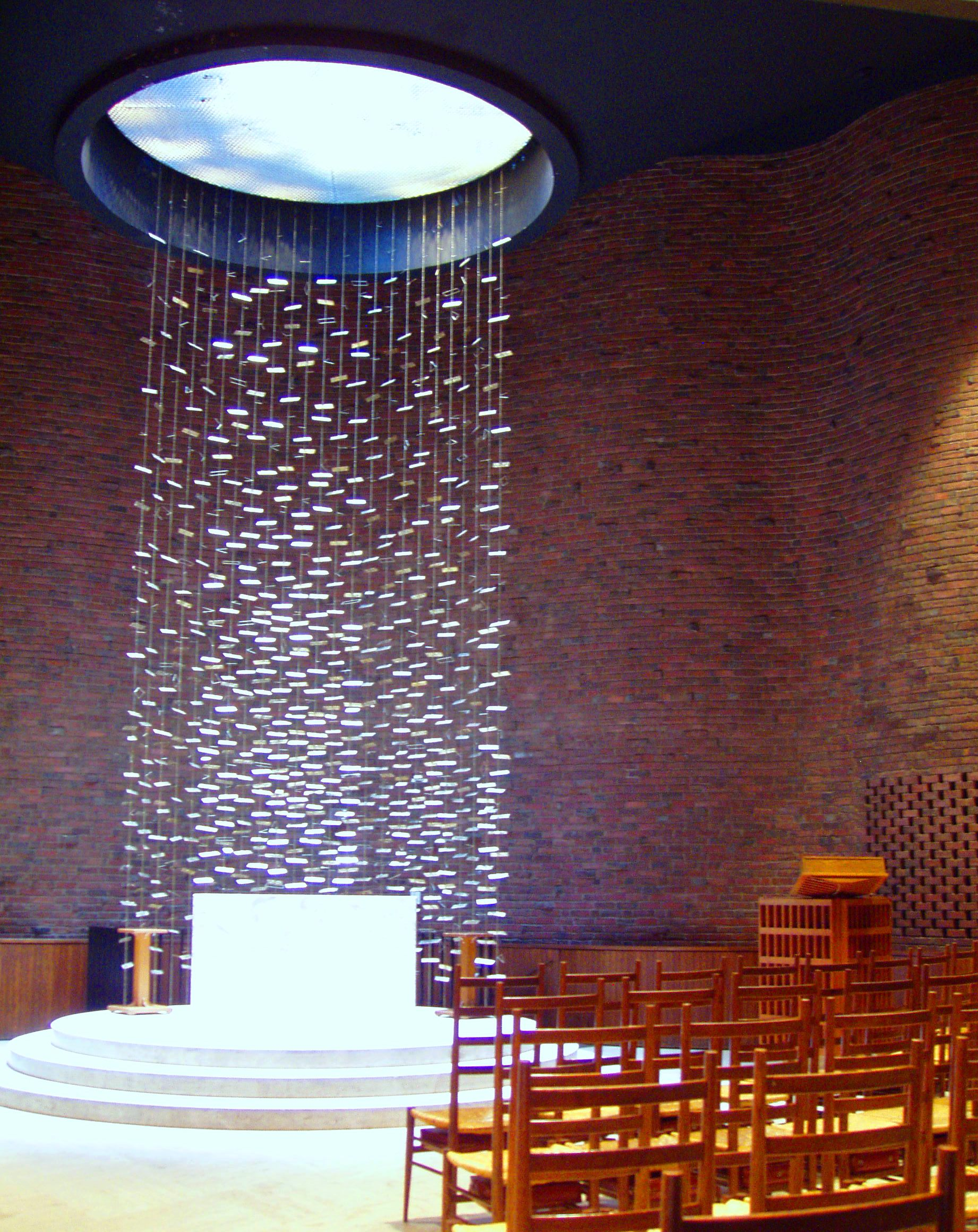
MIT Chapel by Eero Saarinen

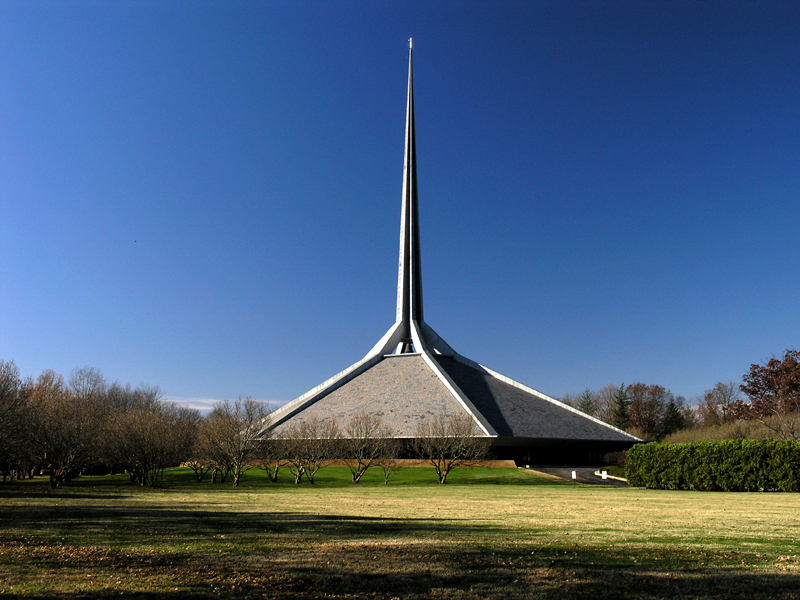
North Christian Church, Columbus, Indiana, US, the final work of Eero Saarinen

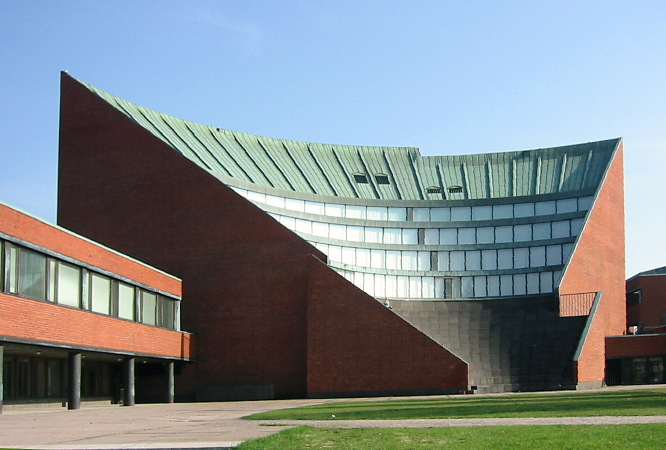
Helsinki, Finland – University of Technology – Auditorium by Alvar Aalto

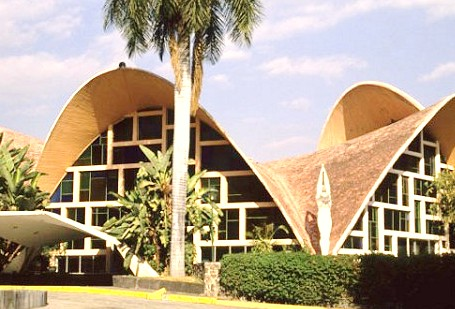
Hotel Casino de la Selva, Cuernavaca, Mexico by Félix Candela

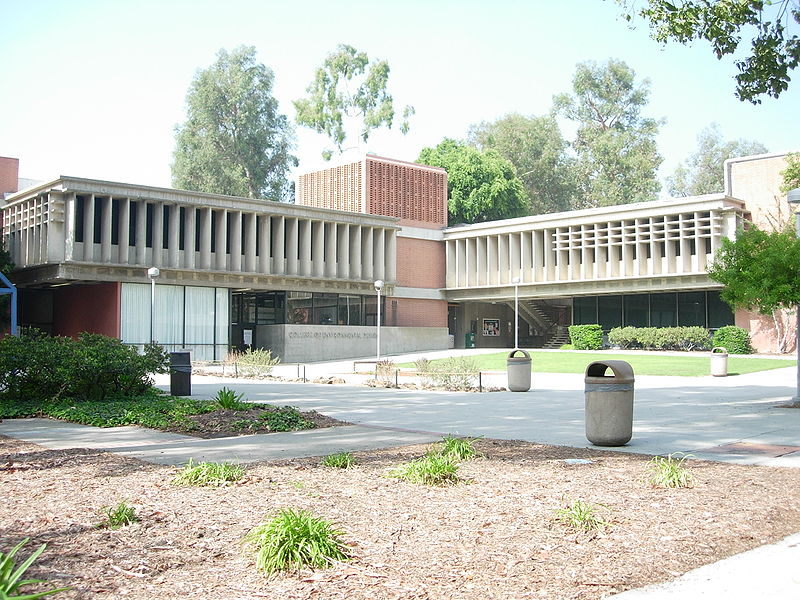
Cal Poly Pomona College of Environmental Design by Carl Maston

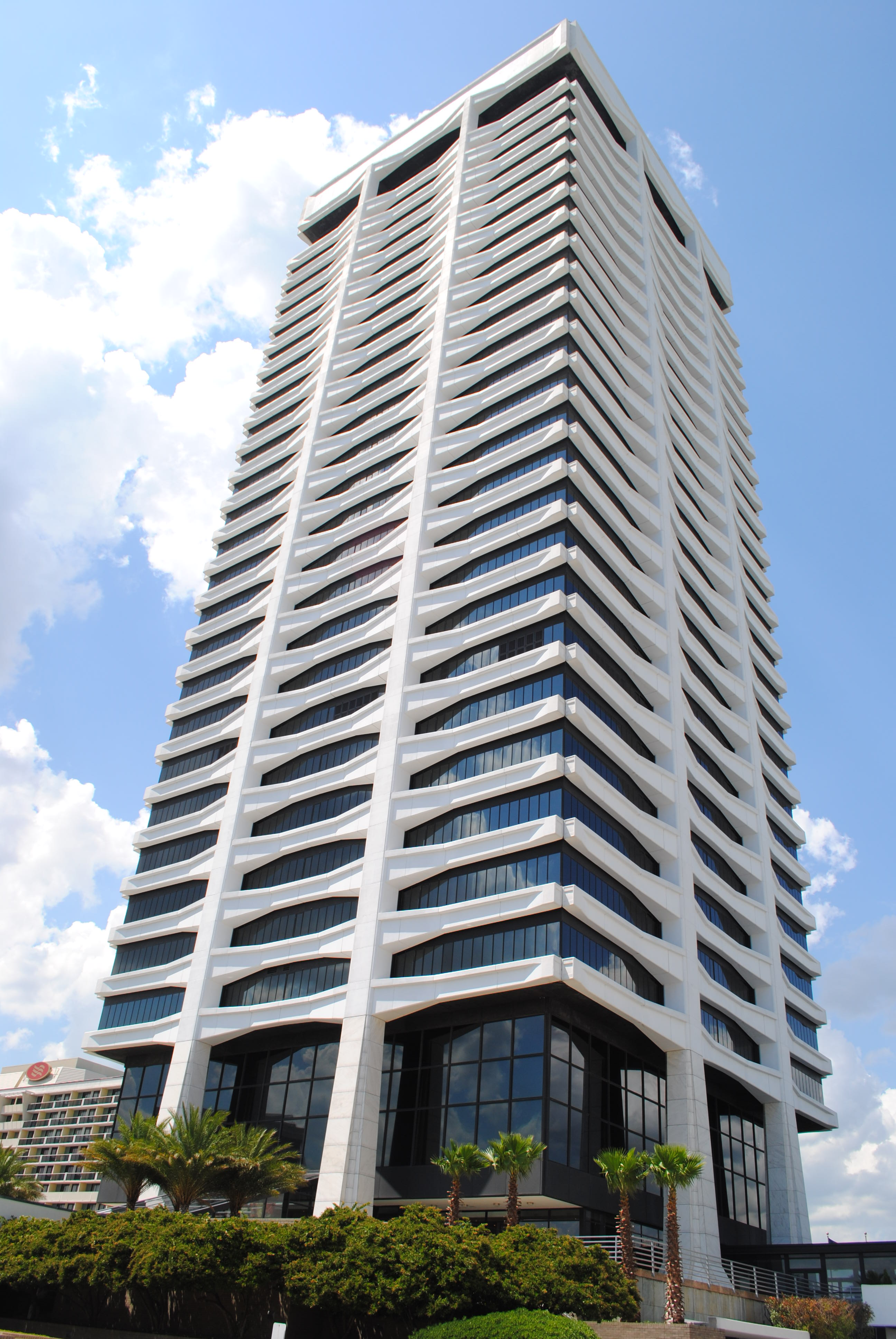
Riverplace Tower, Jacksonville, Florida by Welton Becket

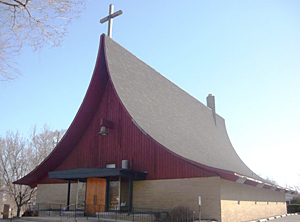
St. Augustine's Episcopal Church in Gary, Indiana by Edward D. Dart

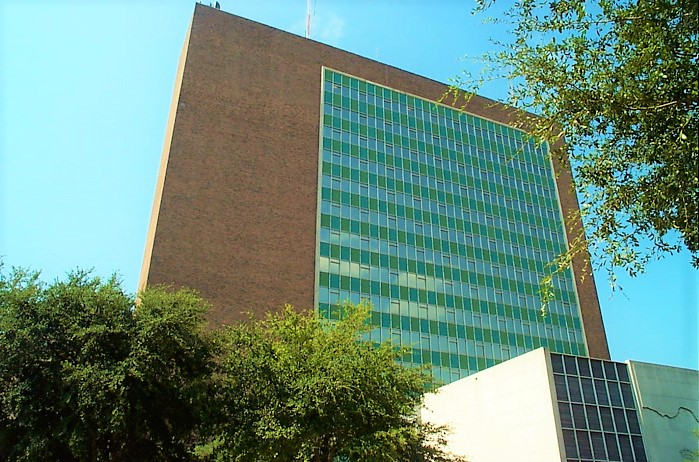
Courthouse Annex Building, (now demolished) Jacksonville, Florida by Reynolds, Smith & Hills

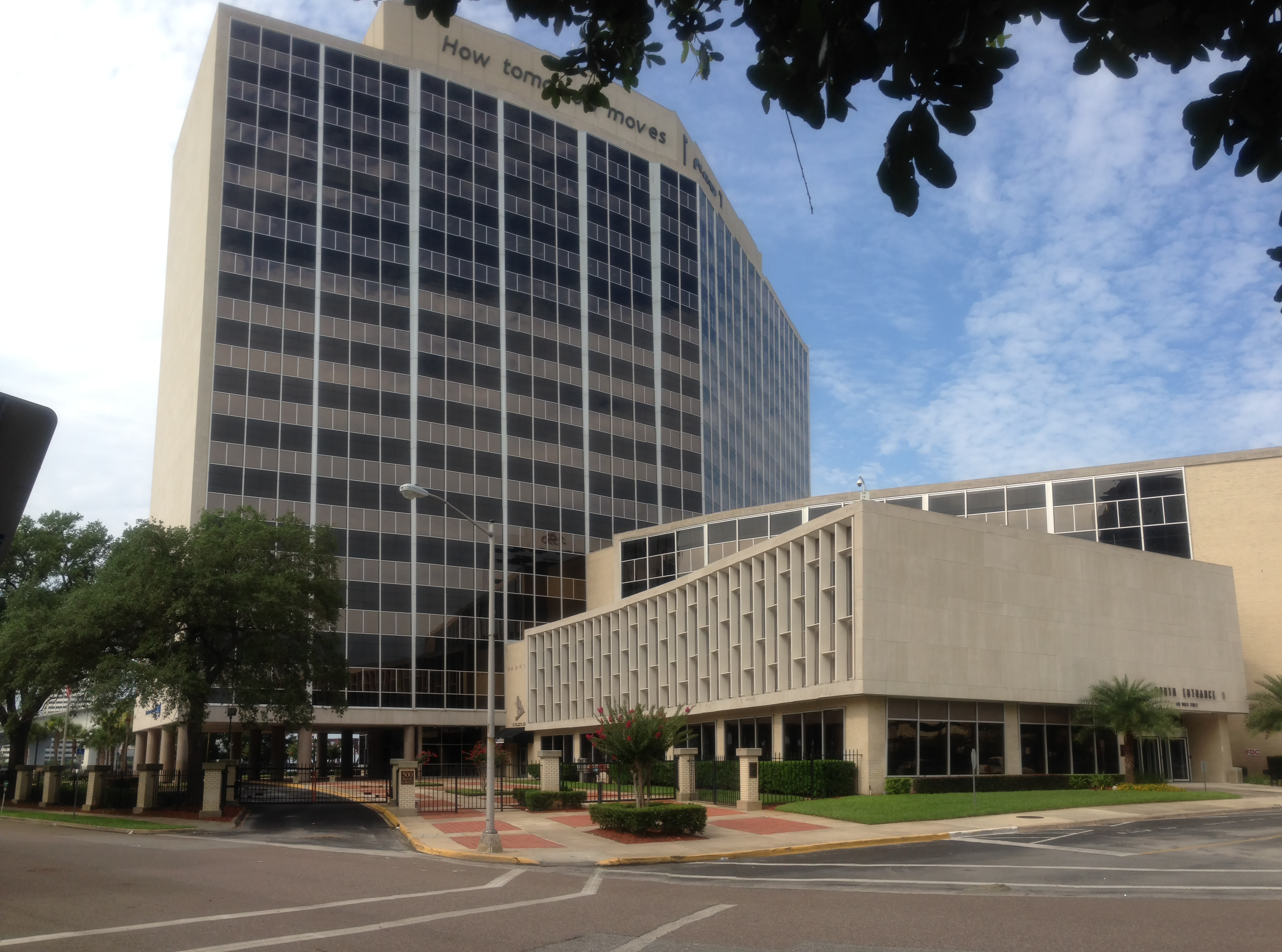
CSX Transportation Building, Jacksonville, Florida by KBJ Architects

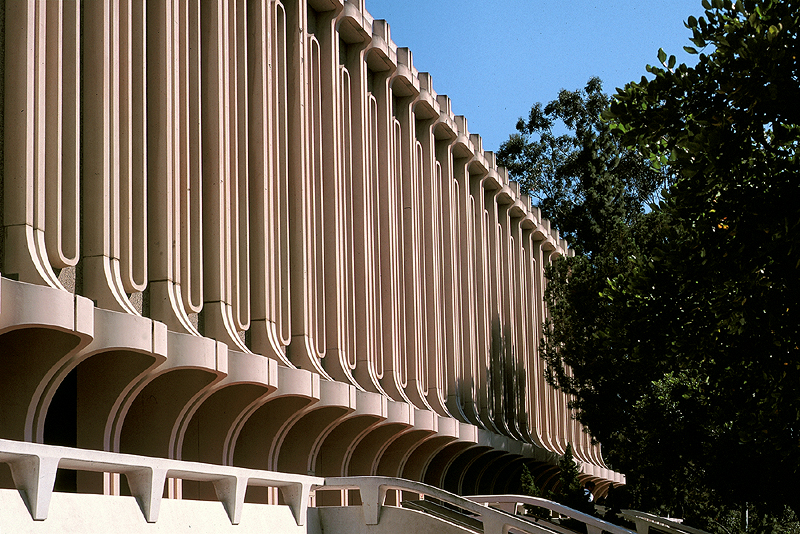
UCI Langson Library, Irvine Ranch, California

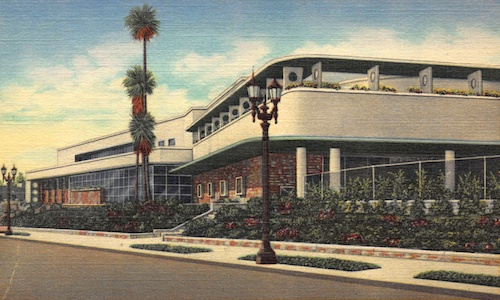
Bullock's Pasadena, California, 1949

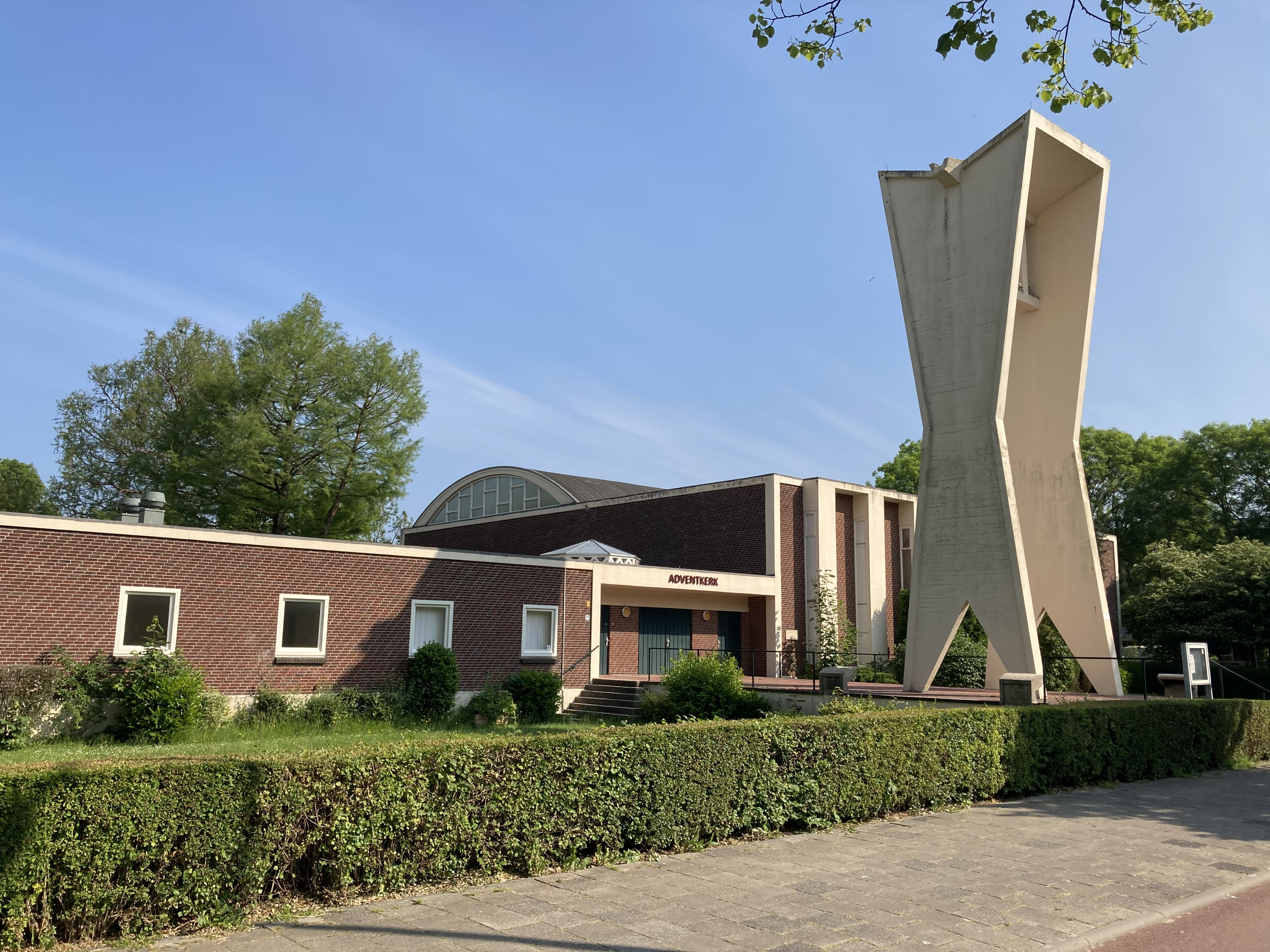
Adventkerk, The Hague, the Netherlands, by K.L. Sijmons, 1954

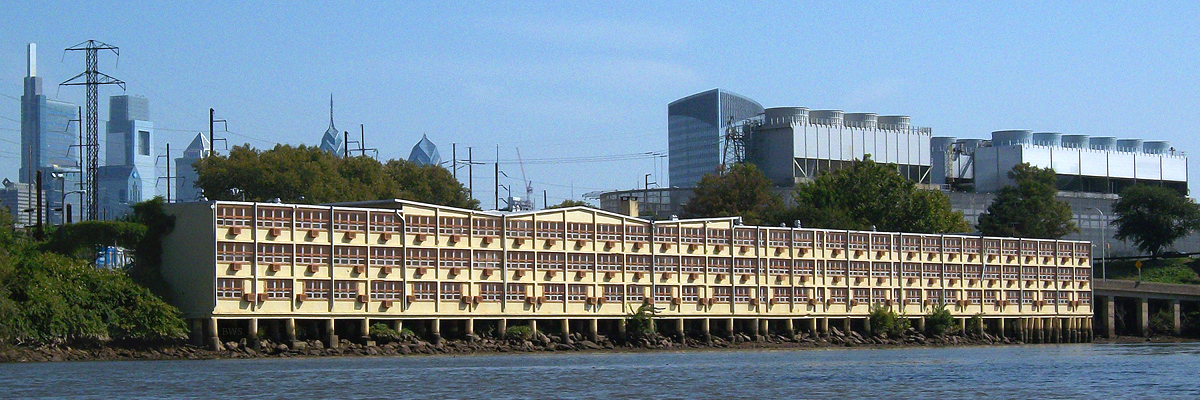
University Motor Inn with partial butterfly roof on the Schuylkill River in Philadelphia, 1960

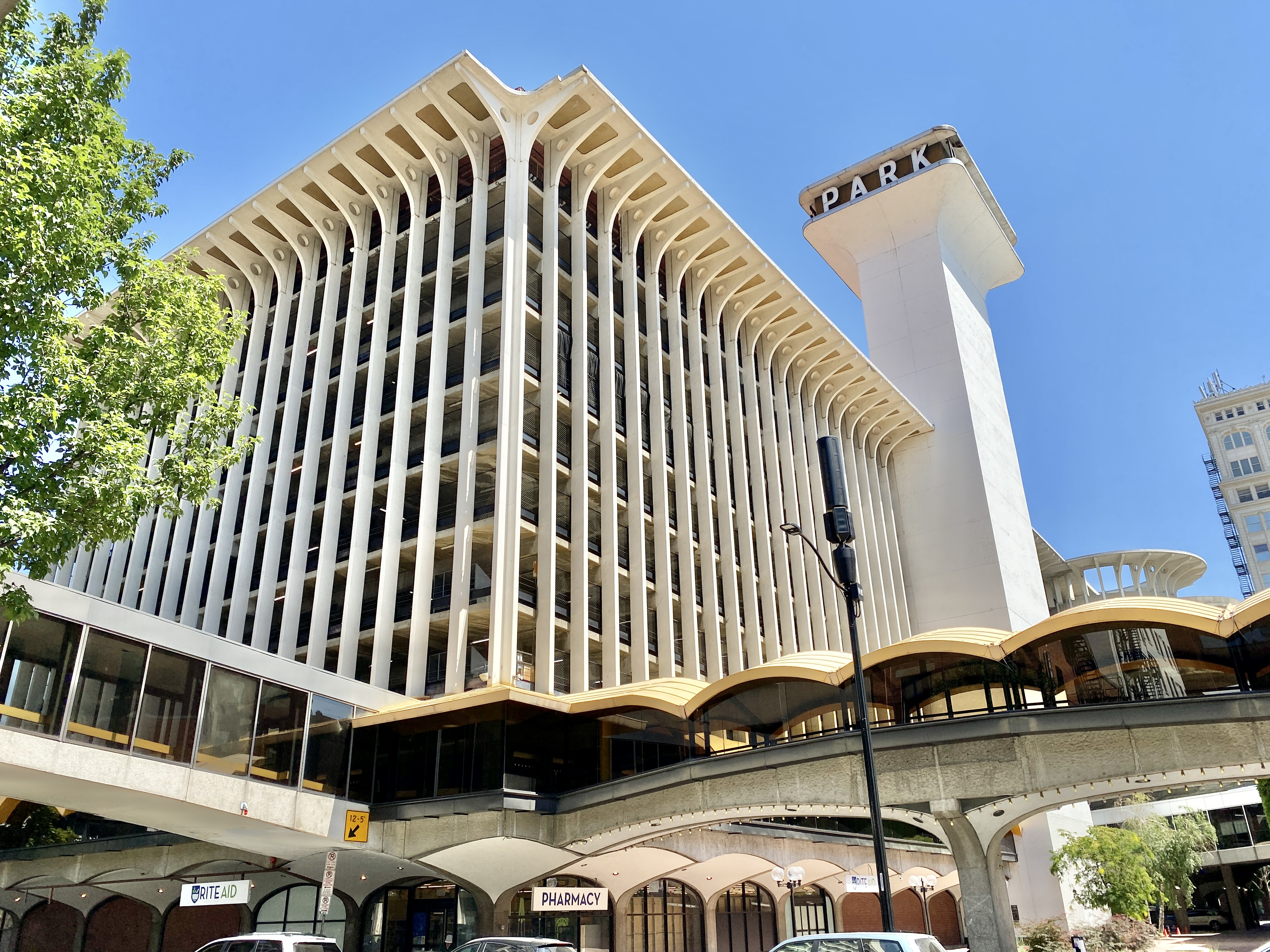
Parkade Plaza in downtown Spokane, Washington

==== Residential ====
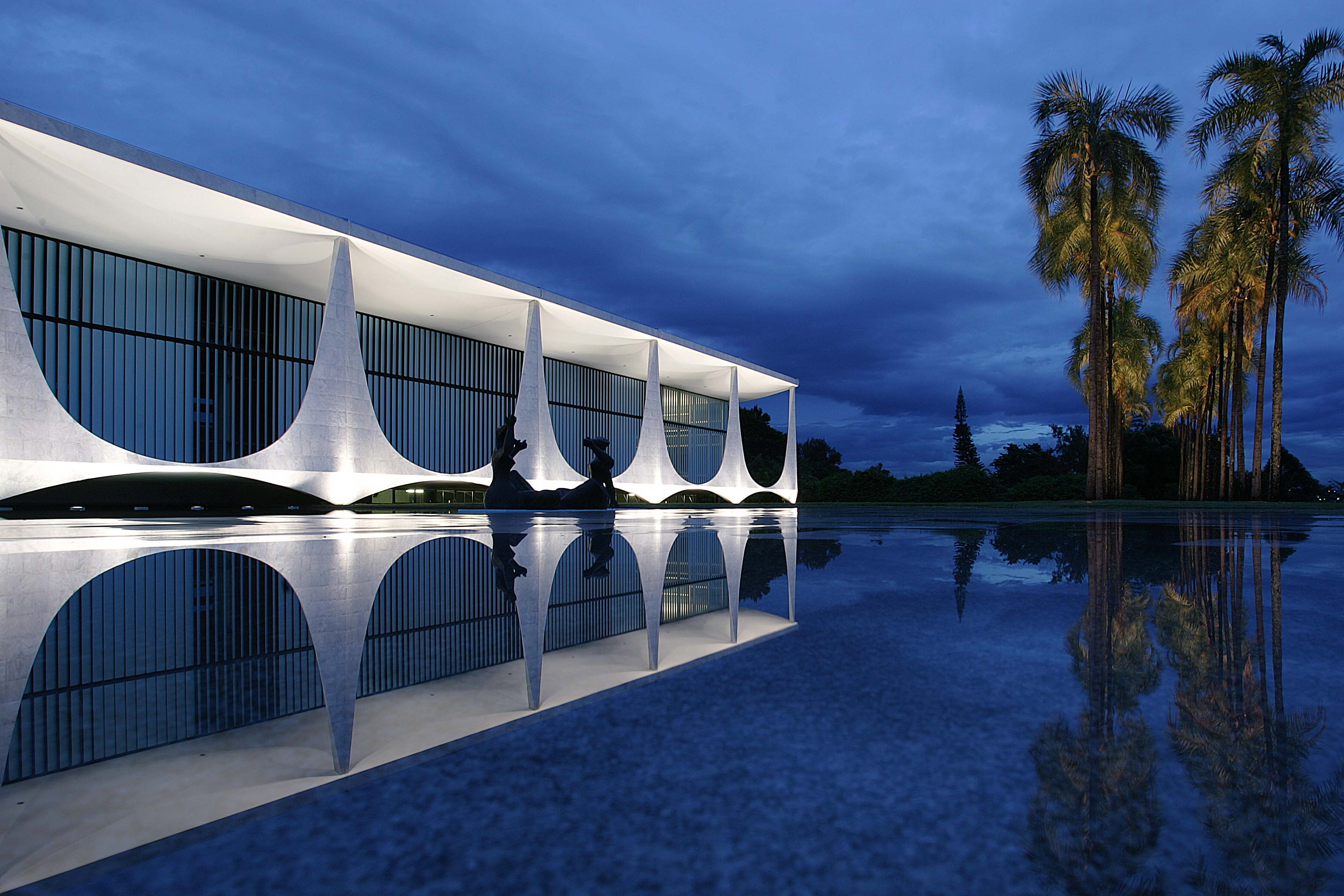
Palacio da Alvorada, official residence of the President of Brazil by Oscar Niemeyer

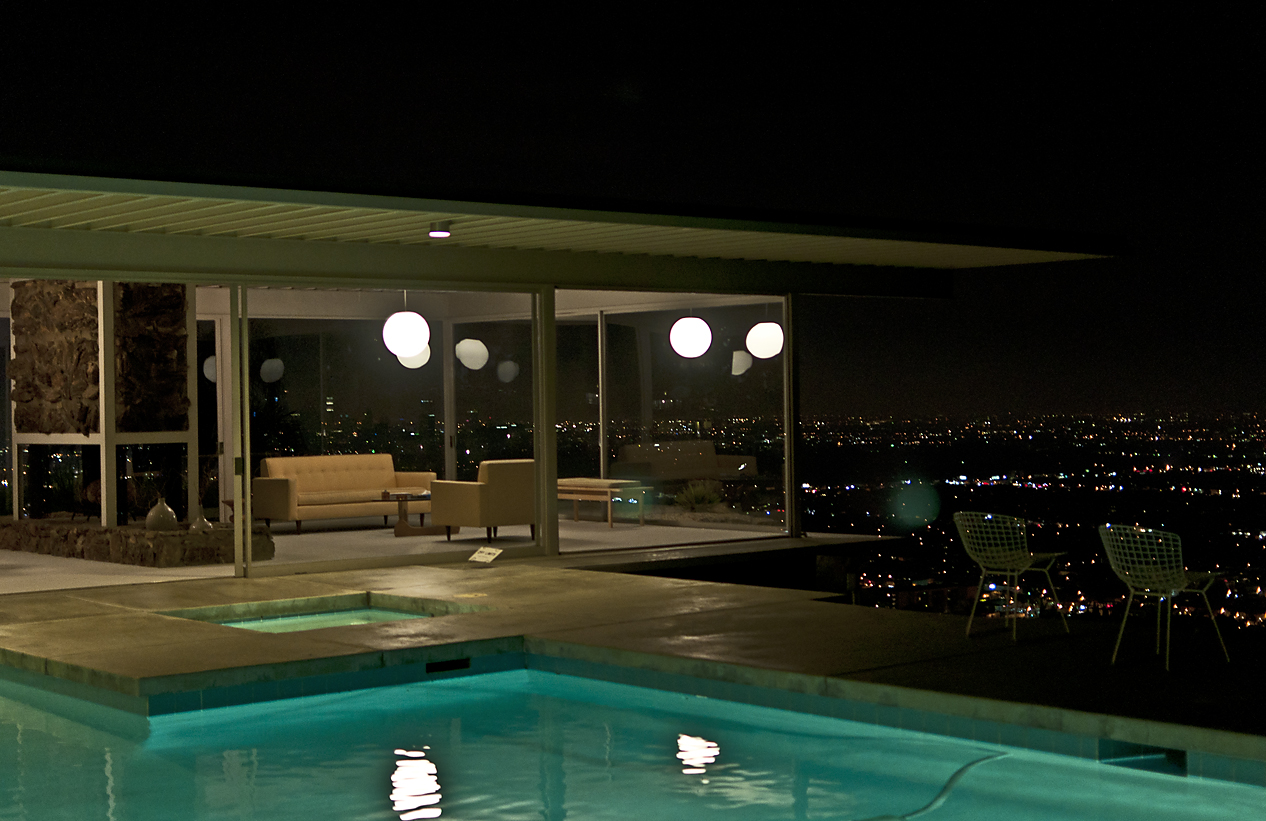
Stahl House by Pierre Koenig

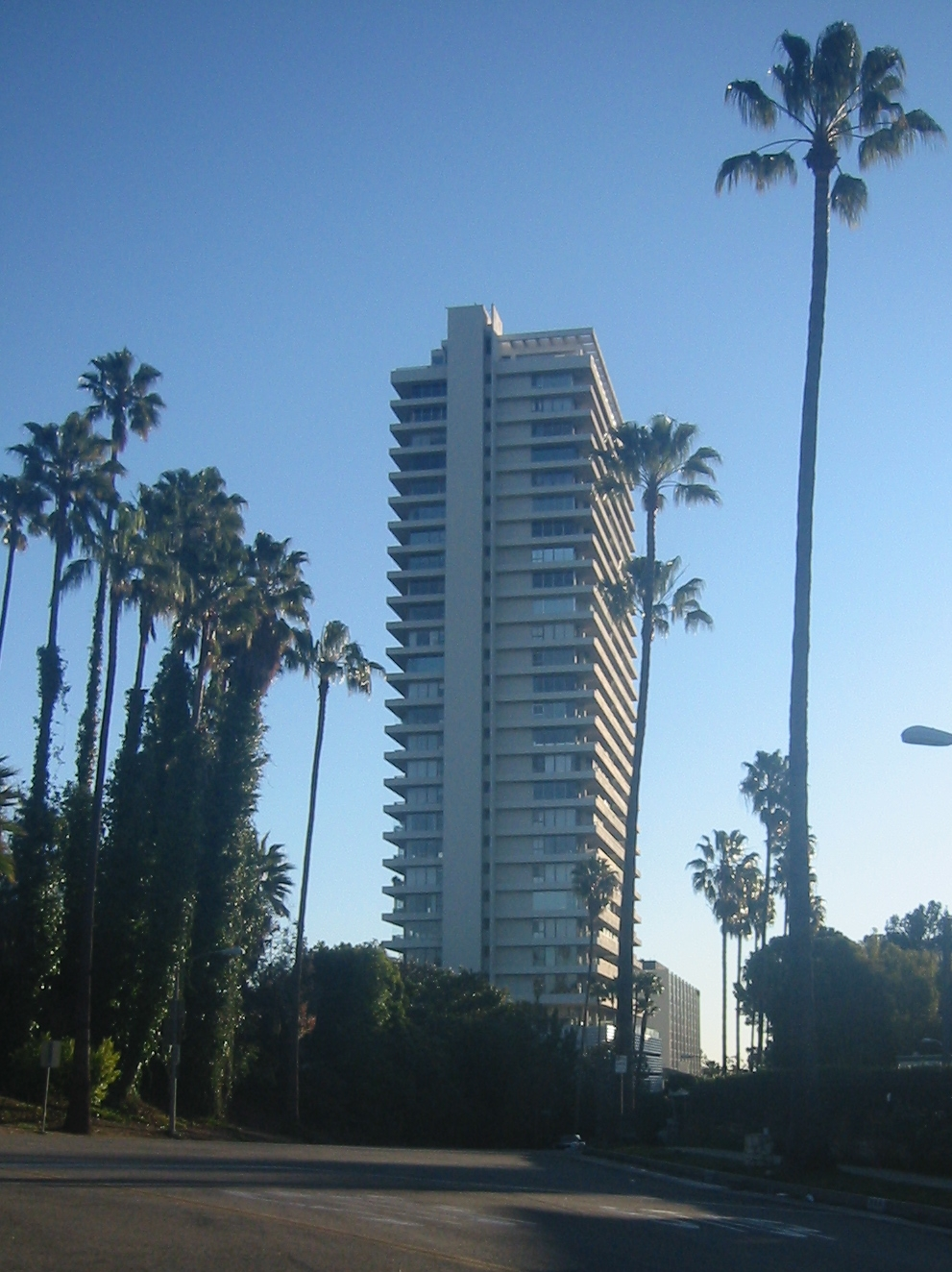
Sierra Towers in West Hollywood, California by Jack A. Charney

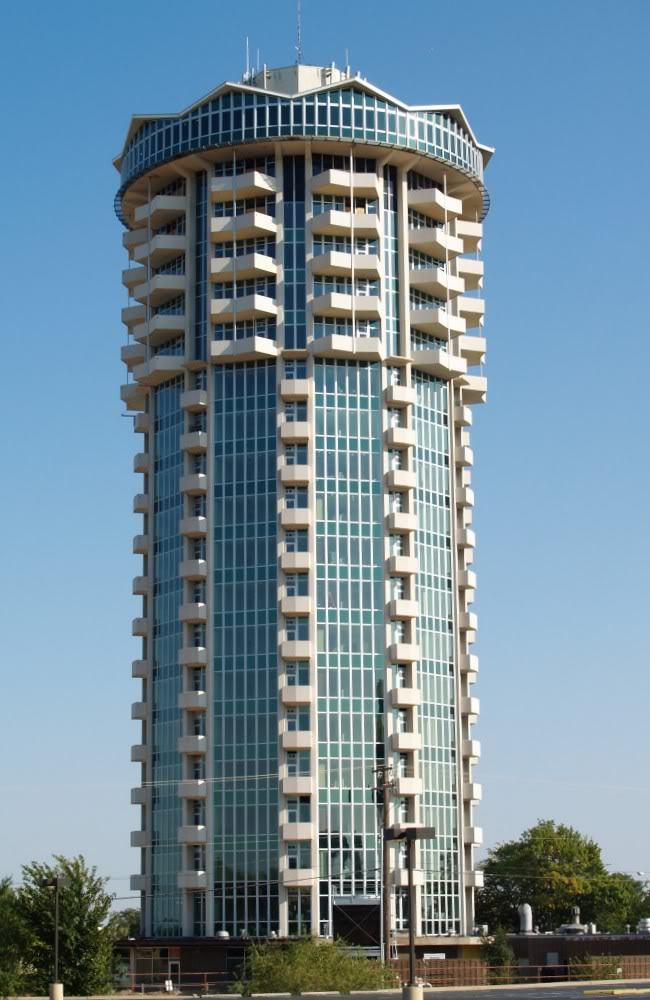
The 360 at Founders Plaza in Oklahoma City

Del Prado Condominiums, Balboa Park, San Diego by William Krisel

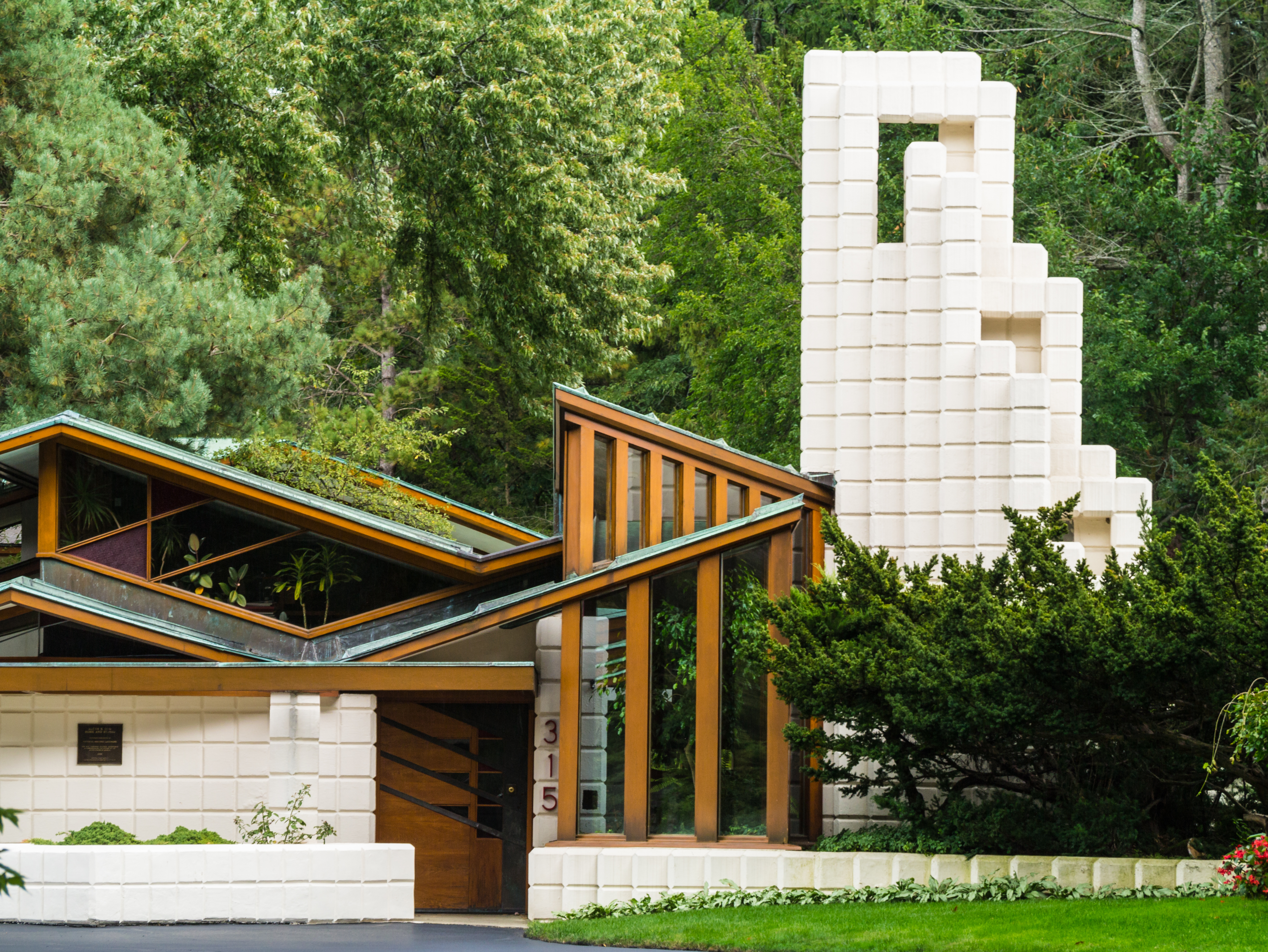
Alden Dow House and Studio, Midland, Michigan by Alden B. Dow

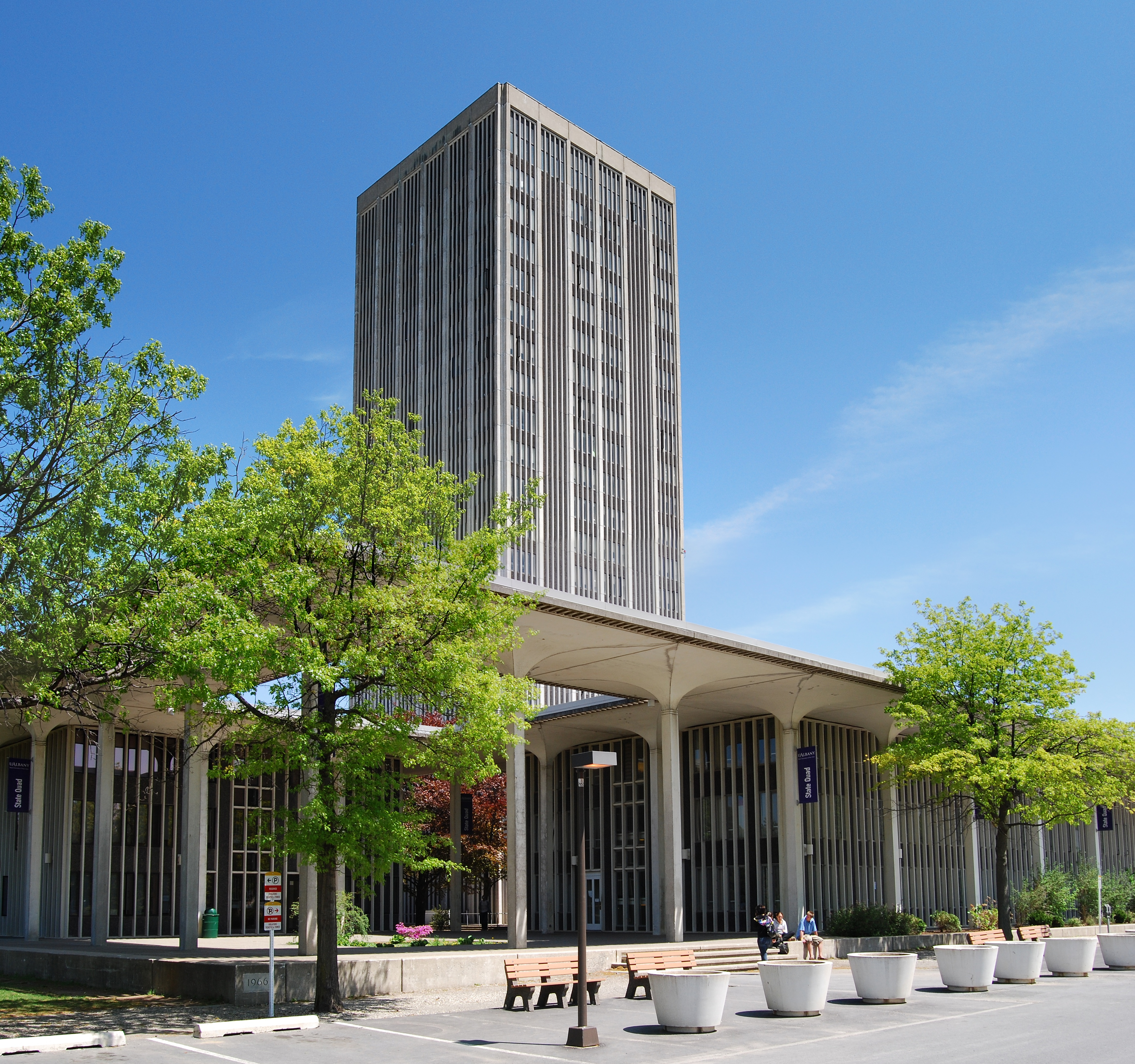
State Quad, one of four identical quadrangle dormitories, at the University at Albany, New York

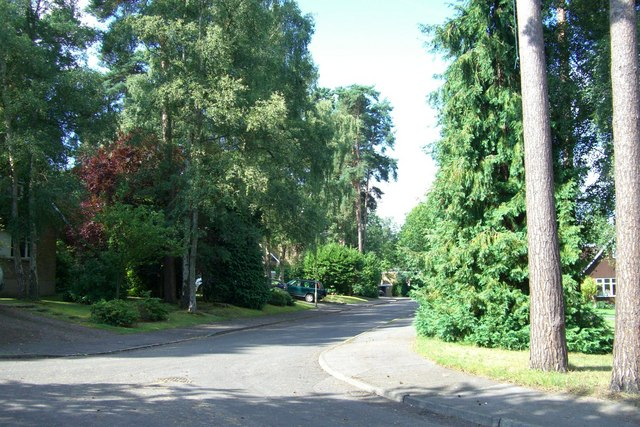
Edgcumbe Park, Crowthorne, England, by the Renway Construction Company

=== Furnishings ===
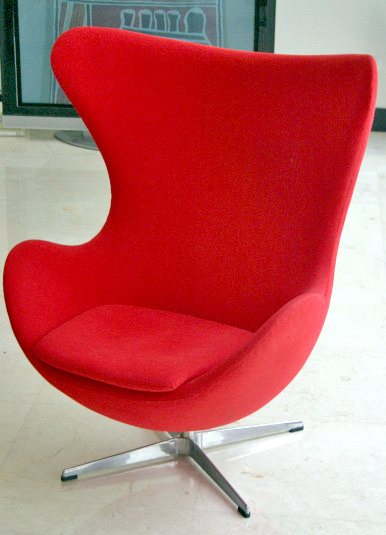
Egg chair by Arne Jacobsen

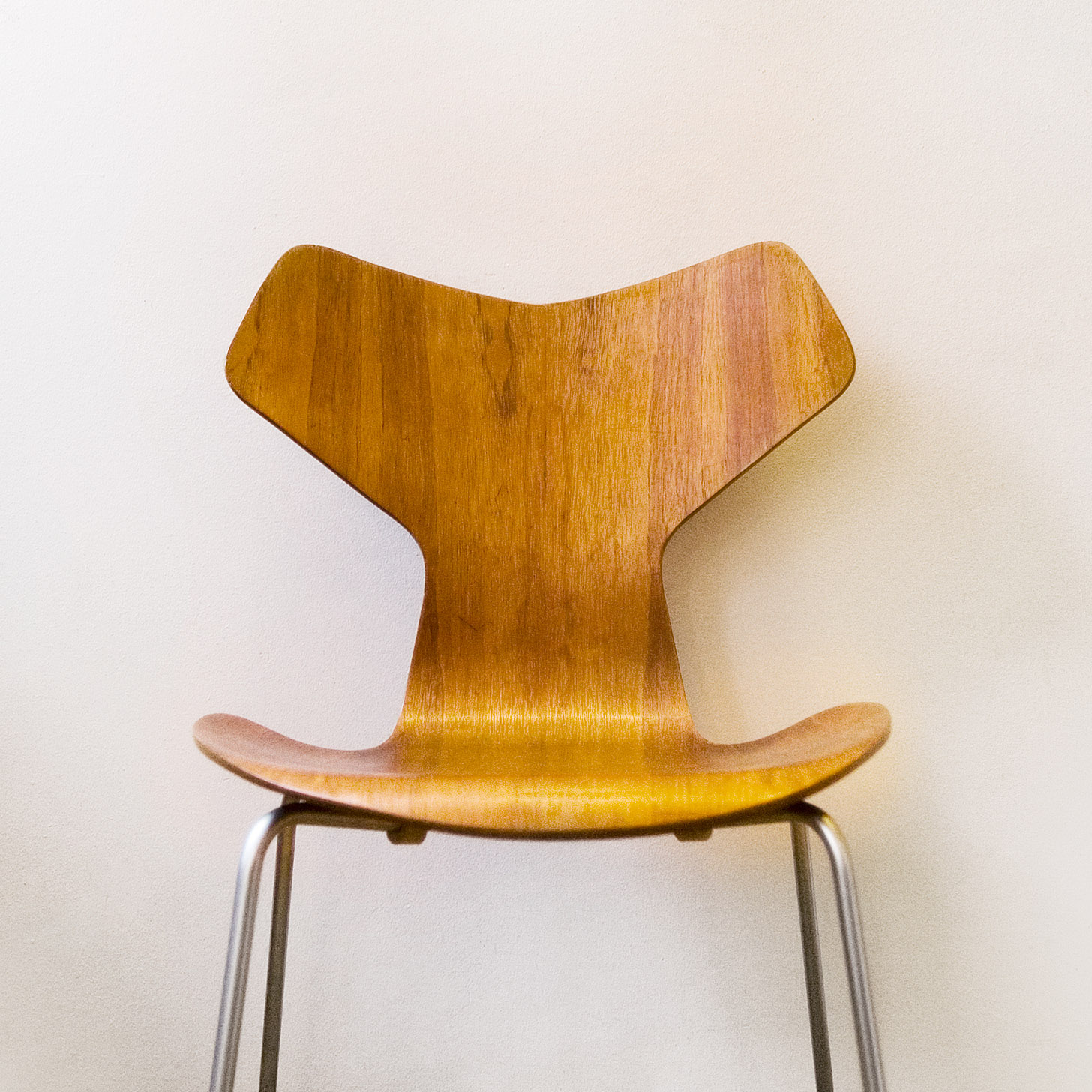
Grand Prix by Arne Jacobsen

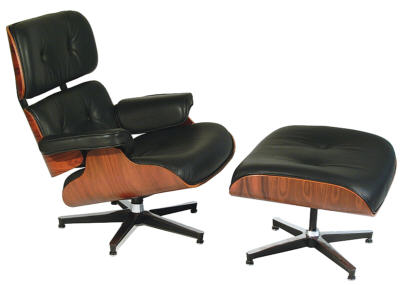
Eames Lounge Chair by Charles and Ray Eames

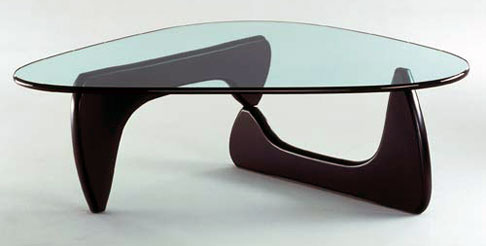
Noguchi table by Isamu Noguchi

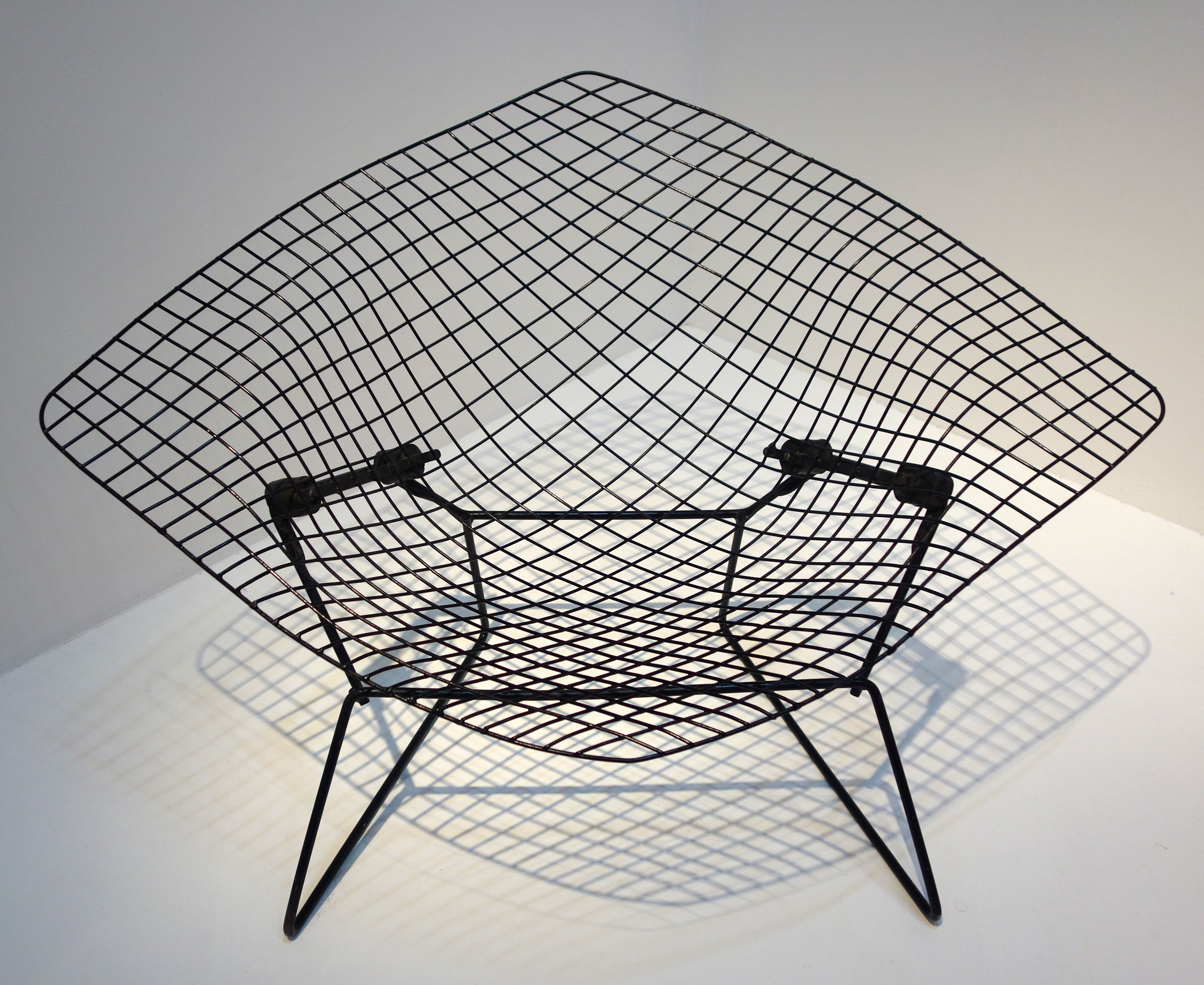
Diamond chair by Harry Bertoia

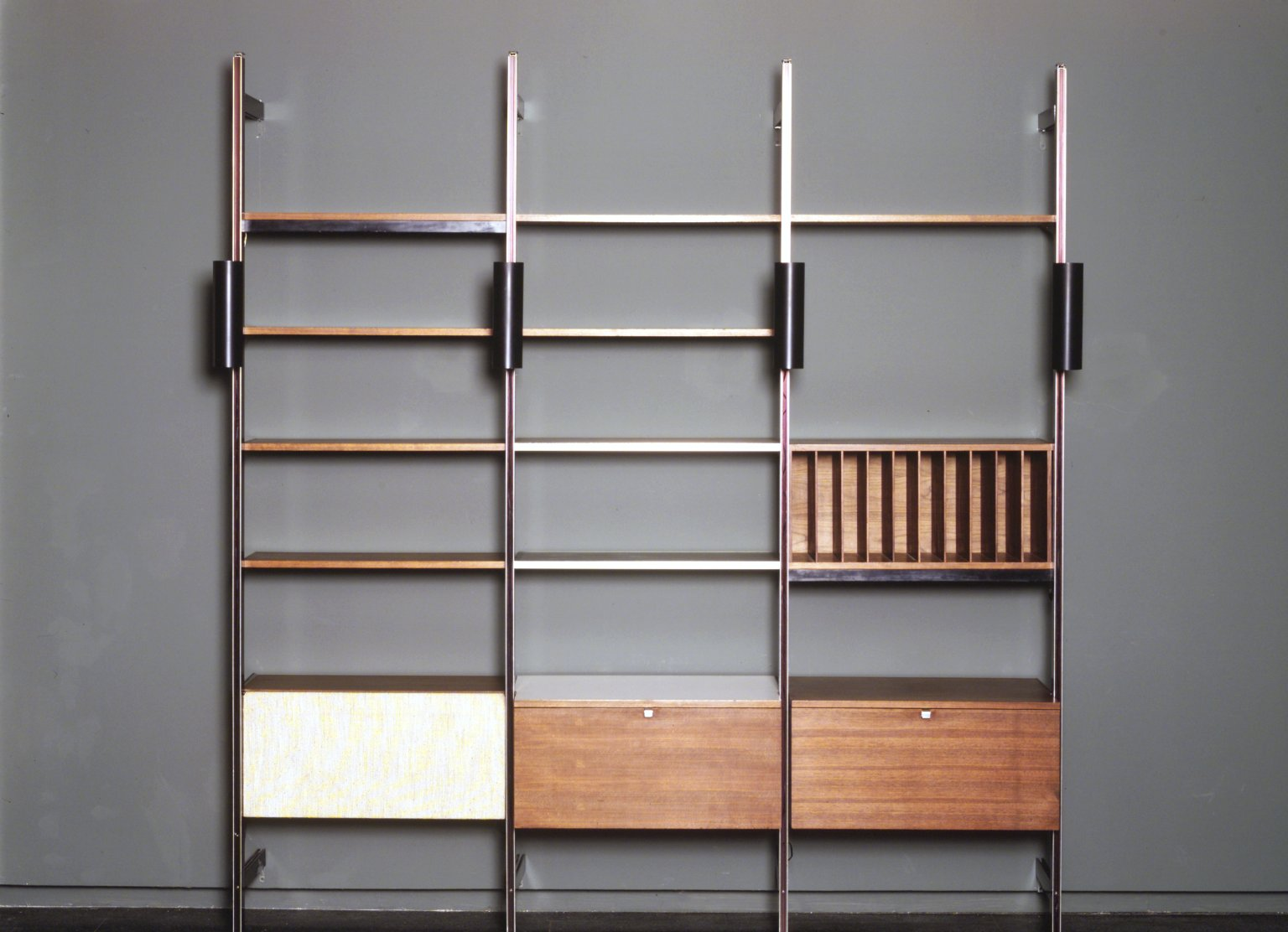
Comprehensive Storage Unit by George Nelson

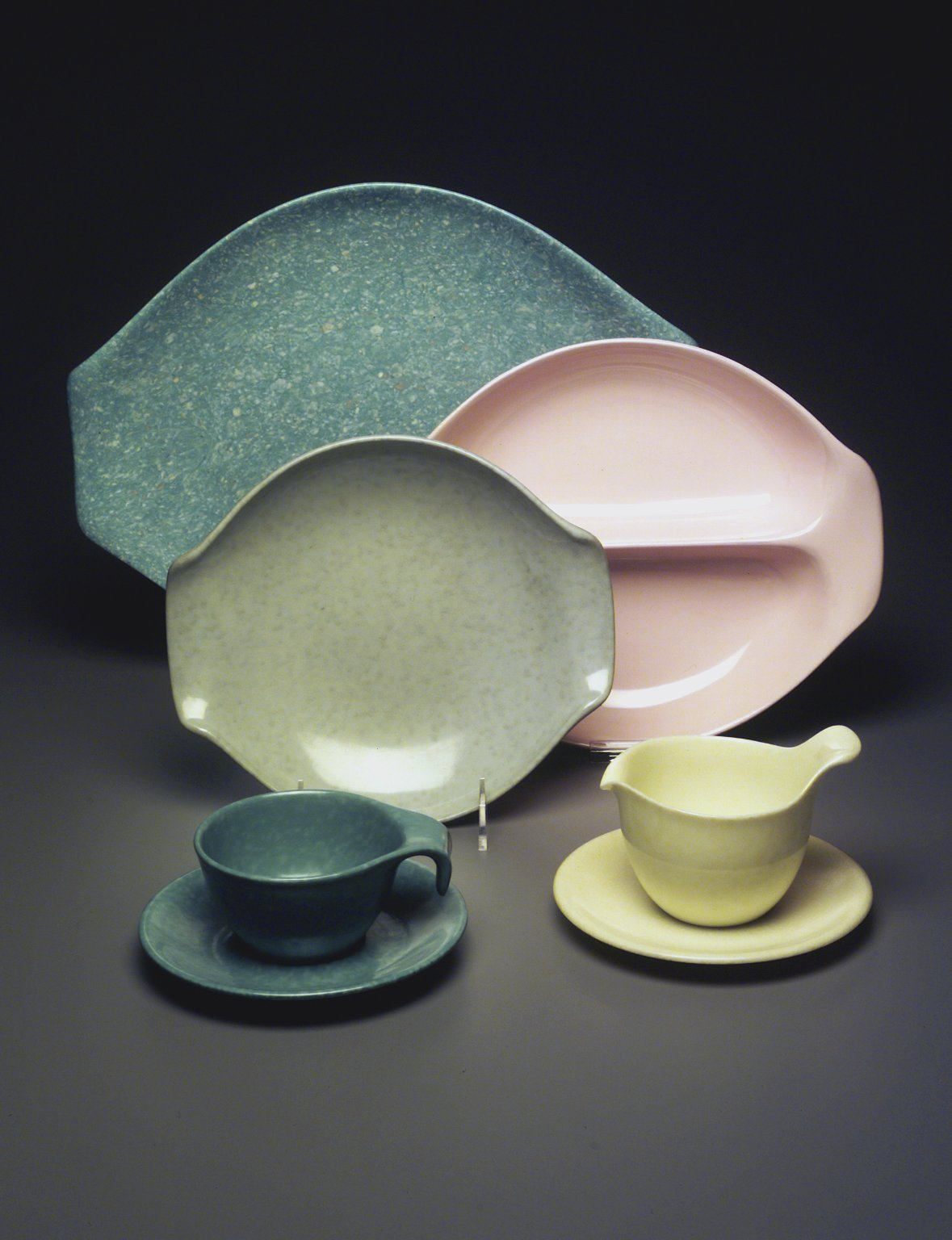
Residential Pattern Serving Set by Russel and Mary Wright (c. 1953)

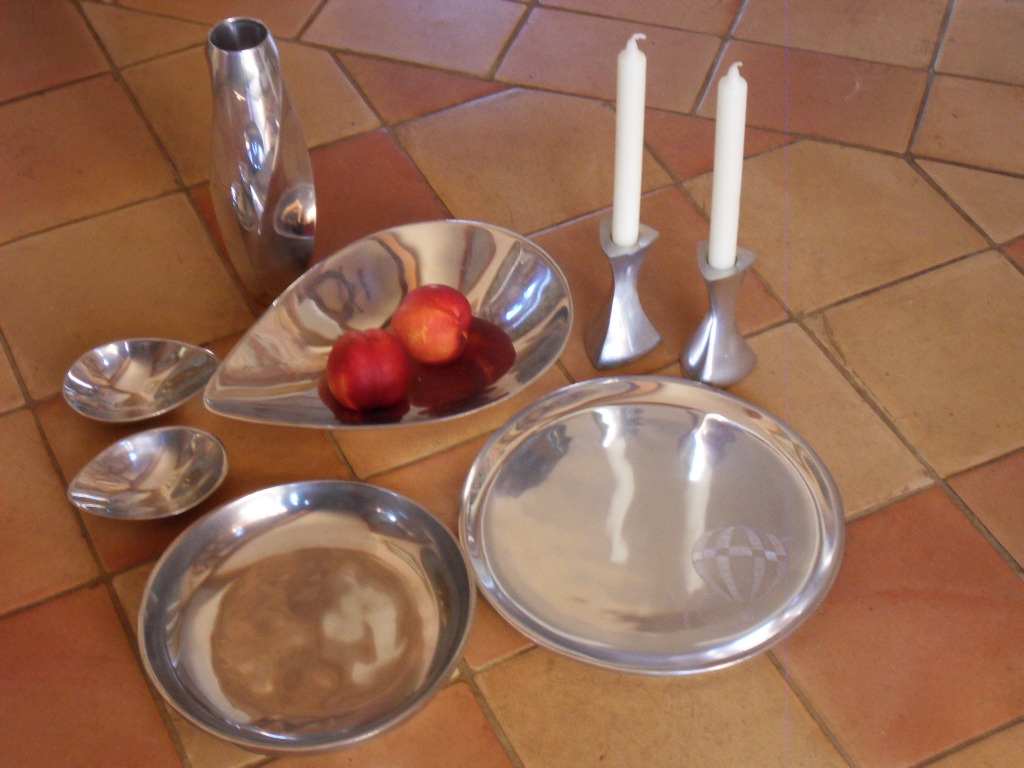
Examples of Nambé Ware designs, (c. 1960)

== Additional notable names ==
- Aino Aalto
- Magdalena Abakanowicz
- Gregory Ain
- Adela Akers
- Anni Albers
- Joyce Anderson
- Ruth Asawa
- Alfons Bach
- Milo Baughman
- Harry Bertoia
- Lili Blumenau
- Lina Bo Bardi
- Robin Boyd
- Marcel Breuer
- Robert C. Broward
- Mary Buskirk
- Jack Allen Charney
- Katherine Choy
- Victor Christ-Janer
- Joe Columbo
- William Curry
- Greta Daniel
- Edward D. Dart
- Lucia DeRespinis
- Richard Lee Dorman
- Charles and Ray Eames
- Joseph Eichler
- Arthur Erickson
- O'Neil Ford
- Paul T. Frankl
- Elsie Freund
- Bertrand Goldberg
- Charles Goodman
- Max Gottschalk
- Eileen Gray
- Lawrence Halprin
- Paul Hamilton
- Eszter Haraszty
- Taylor Hardwick
- Ralph Haver
- Frances Stewart Higgins
- Michael Higgins
- Finn Juhl
- Vladimir Kagan
- Louis Kahn
- Poul Kjaerholm
- Kaare Klint
- Henry Klumb
- Pierre Koenig
- Florence Knoll
- William Krisel
- Mogens Lassen
- Paul Laszlo
- John Lautner
- Roger Lee
- Charles Luckman
- Carl Maston
- Cliff May
- Paul McCobb
- John Randal McDonald
- Leza McVey
- Emil Milan
- Eudorah Moore
- William Morgan
- Børge Mogensen
- George Nelson
- Oscar Niemeyer
- Svend Nielsen
- Isamu Noguchi
- Verner Panton
- Tommi Parzinger
- Adrian Pearsall
- Ruth Penington
- Walter Pierce
- Warren Platner
- Jean Prouvé
- Ira Rakatansky
- Merry Renk
- Jens Risom
- Paul Rudolph
- Eero Saarinen
- Richard Schultz
- Paul Schweikher
- Harry Seidler
- Avriel Shull
- Mel Smilow
- Maurice K. Smith
- Alison and Peter Smithson
- Raphael Soriano
- Russell Spanner
- Marianne Strengell
- Edward Durell Stone
- Art Troutner
- Ole Wanscher
- Hans Wegner
- David Weidman
- Russel Wright and Mary Wright
- Eva Zeisel

== See also ==
- Atomic Age
- Butterfly roof
- Case Study Houses
- Danish modern
- Dingbat
- Googie architecture
- Miami Modern architecture
- Miller House
- Modern architecture
- Modernism
- Populuxe
- SS United States
- United Productions of America
