= Nambé Ware =

Mid-century modern housewares

Nambé is a range of Mid-century modern metal tableware and cookware, with the luster of silver and the solidity of iron, an eight-metal alloy whose major component is aluminum and that retains both hot and cold temperatures. It was originally and exclusively produced by Nambé Mills, Inc. a company founded in 1951 near Nambé Pueblo, some 10 miles north of Santa Fe, New Mexico. Examples have been chosen for exhibition in the Museum of Modern Art in New York and the British Museum in London.

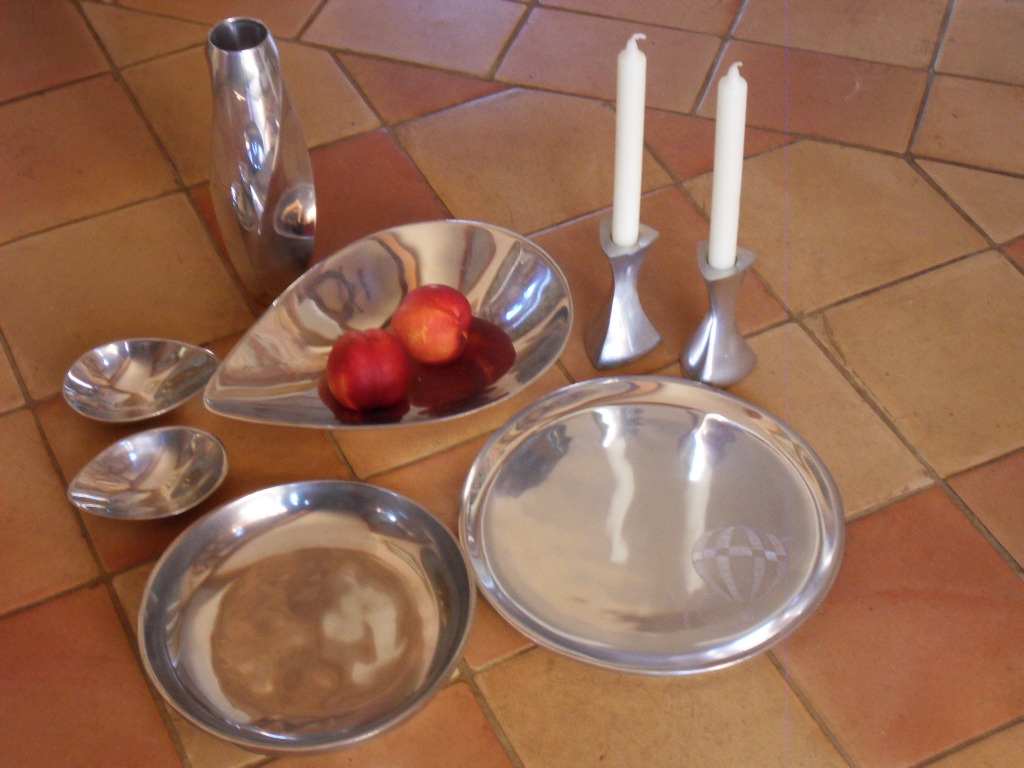
Samples of Nambé ware designs, 1960-80

== History ==
Winkler Mills, a foundry in Pojoaque, New Mexico which had specialized in copper and gift items, was acquired in 1951 by Pauline Cable, who renamed it Nambé Mills after the neighboring community of Nambé Pueblo. The alloy was developed in 1953 by Martin Eden, formerly a metallurgist at the nearby Los Alamos National Laboratory. Cable designed the original range of bowls and other items to be cast in the foundry, some of which are still in the product range. Nambé metalware is crafted from an alloy containing eight metals including aluminum, giving it the look of shiny silver. The company's portfolio was later expanded to include cutlery, glassware, woodware, dinnerware, kitchenware, home décor and jewellery.

Following a fire, the company’s foundry was moved to Santa Fe in 1976, and remained there until 1994 when it was moved to Espanola, and later moved abroad to Asia. At one time, Nambé employed hundreds of people in Northern New Mexico.

In 1999, Nambé worked with the designer Eva Zeisel to produce a line of Nambé Ware objects including a platter, bowl, vase and salt and pepper shakers, that were based on the Tomorrow's Classic that was first introduced in 1952. In 2001, Zeisel worked with the industrial designer Steve Cozzolino on a collection of objects for Nambé.

In 2017, Nambé created a jewelry collection in sterling silver, designed with the same aerodynamic styling as the tableware.

Portmeirion Group purchased Nambé in 2019 for $12 million. The acquisition provided the British company with a stronger influence in the US market, as Nambé’s sales had been largely through retail stores in New Mexico and Arizona initially, and soon thereafter through upmarket national retailers (Macy's, Bloomingdale's, Neiman Marcus, Nordstrom, etc.). Production of the alloy metalwork is now in India, and woodware produced in Thailand, stainless steel flatware in Vietnam and crystal glassware. As a subsidiary of Portmeirion, it now trades as Nambé International.

Nambé Ware items are included in the permanent collection of the British Museum, the Museum of Modern Art, the Chicago Athenaeum, the International Museum of Design, and the Center for Modern Art, Prague.
