= William Curry (designer) =

American designer (1927–1971)

William Edwin Curry (March 4, 1927 – April 28, 1971) or Bill Curry was an American designer associated with the mid-century modern school of design.

A graduate of the Los Angeles Art Center, Curry began his career as an art director for the Ramo-Wooldridge Corporation, a precursor of the later TRW Inc. In 1962, Curry founded the home furnishings company Design Line, Inc. in El Segundo, California. Many of Curry's creations were showcased at the Pasadena Art Museum and, after being labeled the "best lamps of the year" by Industrial Design magazine, his iconic "Stemlites" were selected by the U.S. Department of Commerce for display in exhibitions in the Soviet Union, Yugoslavia, and Iraq as examples of quality American design. By 1969, Curry's reputation had developed to the point that the Los Angeles Times would describe him as "one of California's leading designers." Upon his death, a retrospective of Curry's designs was presented at the Brand Library Art Center in Glendale, California.

University of California-Los Angeles art professor Bernard Kester and University of Southern California art professor Susan Peterson remarked that "Curry may be credited with originating the first total look in lamp forms, eliminating the base-plus-shade concept, then designing the lamp exploiting the bare bulb, then reshaping the bulb to shape the lamp as an integral unit."
