= Ruth Penington =

American artist, jeweler, craft activist (1905–1998)

- Born: Ruth Esther Penington; June 4, 1905; Colorado Springs, Colorado, U.S.
- Died: 1998 (aged 92–93)
- Education: University of Washington (BFA), Columbia University (MFA)
- Known for: Jeweler, metal arts, educator

Ruth Esther Penington (1905–1998) was an American visual artist, jeweler, and arts activist.

== Life and career ==
Ruth Esther Penington was born on June 4, 1905, in Colorado Springs, Colorado, and grew up in Seattle. She received an undergraduate degree, a Bachelor of Fine Arts in 1927, from the University of Washington, followed by a Master of Fine Arts degree in 1929 from Columbia University.

Penington was instrumental in the founding of the Northwest Printmakers Society, the Northwest Designer Craftsmen, Friends of the Crafts in Seattle and the World Craft Council in New York City. She was named fellow of the American Craft Council in 1976. Her work is included in the collections of the Seattle Art Museum, and the Tacoma Art Museum.
