= Eudorah Moore =

American curator and patron of the arts

- Born: Eudorah Goodell Morse; June 15, 1918; Denver, Colorado, U.S.
- Died: April 20, 2013 (aged 94); Pasadena, California
- Education: Smith College
- Occupations: Curator; patron of arts
- Spouse: Anson Churchill Moore
- Children: 4

Eudorah Moore (June 15, 1918 – April 20, 2013) was an American curator and patron of the arts. She is regarded as revolutionizing California design, and for her advocacy of craft as an art form.

== Biography ==
Moore née Morse was born on June 15, 1918, in Denver Colorado. She studied at Smith College, graduating in 1940. The same year she married Anson Moore with whom she had 4 children. The couple moved to California in the early 1940s. She started her career at the Pasadena Arts Museum as a volunteer. In the early 1950s, Moore became the founding president of the Pasadena Art Alliance, which was organized to provide support to art institutions in Pasadena, particularly the Pasadena Art Museum. By 1957 she was president of the board of the museum. Continuing her long-standing interest in crafts, in 1961 she took over the Museum's series of California Design exhibitions, changing them from small, annual shows of furniture into "a blockbuster juried triennial" of virtually anything designed or made in California.

From 1962 to 1977, Moore served as curator of the Pasadena Arts Museum (now the Norton Simon Museum), located in Pasadena, California. She has been credited with turning the Pasadena Art Museum's annual California Design show into a "blockbuster juried triennial".

Moore was crafts coordinator for the National Endowment for the Arts from 1978 to 1981.

In 1973 Moore was honored by Smith College. In 1979 she received an honorary doctorate from the California College of Arts and Crafts. In 1980 Moore was made an honorary Fellow of the American Crafts Council.

Moore died on April 20, 2013, in Pasadena, California.

== Quotes ==
"The social as well as the physical climate of California in the 20th century has presented the ideal breeding ground for the new, and more broadly based wave of humane declaration, which we call the New Craftman's Movement. With remnants of the do-it-yourself need of the frontier spirit still intact, and with the sense of individual worth and identity from that experience still within memory, there was little in subjugation or established pattern to overcome. Self-expression was in many ways the base of the culture."

== See also ==
- List of people from Pasadena, California
