= Adrian Pearsall =

American architect

- Born: September 18, 1925; Trumansburg, New York
- Died: September 6, 2011 (aged 85)
- Occupations: Architect, furniture designer
- Years active: 1950-2011
- Spouse: Dorie Pearsall

Adrian Pearsall (born 1925, Trumansburg, New York) was an American architect and mid-century furniture designer.

Adrian Mount Pearsall was born in Trumansburg New York. As a young man he went to the University of Illinois and studied Architectural Engineering, graduating in 1950. That same year, he married his wife Dorie Kanarr Pearsall.

Adrian Pearsall founded Craft Associates in Kingston, Pennsylvania in 1952 to manufacture his own designs. He initially began crafting furniture with wrought iron, but by the late 1950s his designs incorporating walnut became hugely popular.

In 1962, Pearsall designed and built a home for his family in Forty Fort, Pennsylvania featuring an indoor swimming pool, atriums, and full-size ice cream bar.

In 2023, Pearsall was posthumously inducted into the Luzerne County Arts & Entertainment Hall of Fame. He was among the Hall of Fame's inaugural class of inductees.
