= Lili Blumenau =

American fiber artist

- Born: November 28, 1912; Berlin, Germany
- Died: September 6, 1976 (aged 63); Bronx New York
- Known for: Textile art

Lili Blumenau (1912–1976) was an American fiber artist. She was a pivotal figure in the development of fiber arts and textile arts, particularly weaving, in the United States during the mid-part of the 20th century.

== Early life and education ==
Blumenau was born on November 28, 1912 in Berlin, Germany. Blumenau is a graduate of the Akademie der Künste (Berlin), the Académie scandinave in Paris, and was the first woman to graduate from the New York School of Textile Technology. She also studied at Black Mountain College.

== Work and career ==
After her education, Blumenau went on to become an instructor in several schools in New York City including Columbia University's Teacher's College, where she started a weaving workshop. She founded the weaving department at the Fashion Institute of Technology and Design in 1952. In addition to maintaining her own weaving studio on Tenth Street in Manhattan, she served as the curator of textiles at Cooper Union Museum from 1944 to 1950.

In 1955 Blumenau authored the text The Art and Craft of Hand Weaving, Including Fabric Design, which had a significant impact on her field. This text provided technical details and patterns for loom weaving as well as a conceptual approach to the methodologies of hand weaving as "engaging, fully-human, and life-giving". Her work provided inspiration to the Catholic Worker Movement, a collection of autonomous communities of Catholics to whom she taught weaving to several members at the Peter Maurin Farm. In 1975 Blumenau was awarded Fellow of the Council by the American Craft Council. Blumenau died on September 6, 1976 in the Bronx.

== Collections ==
Lili Blumenau's works are in the permanent collection at the Cooper Hewitt Museum and the Museum of Arts and Design.

== Additional sources ==
1. Adams, Alice. "Lili Blumenau." Craft Horizons v.22, no. 2 (March 1962) p.16-20.
2. Blumenau, Lili. "Experiments in Sample Weaving." Craft Horizons v.17, no. 2 ( March 1957) p. 18-22.
3. "Lili Blumenau, 1912-1976." Craft Horizons v.37, no.1 (February 1977) p. 10.
