= Greta Daniel =

American curator (1909–1962)

- Born: 1909; Essen, Germany
- Died: 1962 (aged 52–53); New York, New York
- Occupation: Curator

Greta Daniel (1909–1962) was an Associate Curator in the Department of Architecture and Design at The Museum of Modern Art, New York.

== Early life and education ==
Daniel was born in 1905 in Essen, Germany. She graduated from the Ludwig-Maximilians-Universität München and worked at the Museum Folkwang, Essen. She arrived in the United States as a refugee.

== Career ==
Daniel joined the Museum of Modern Art in 1943 as Assistant in the Department of Industrial Design, and by 1946 she had been named Assistant Curator. Daniel became the resident expert on industrial design, playing an important role in developing the collection and contributing to numerous exhibitions.

In 1954, she edited the teaching portfolio Useful Objects Today. She also wrote Introduction to Twentieth Century Design from the Collection of The Museum of Modern Art.

During the 1950s and early 1960s, she authored articles in the journal Craft Horizons.

== Death ==
Daniel died suddenly in 1962. Sheila Hicks created the artwork Greta no. 55 (1961) in her memory.

== Exhibitions ==
Daniel curated several exhibitions for the Museum of Modern Art including Thonet Furniture (1953), Playground Sculpture (1954), and 20th Century Design from the Museum Collection (1958).
