= Tramway Gas Station =

- U.S. National Register of Historic Places
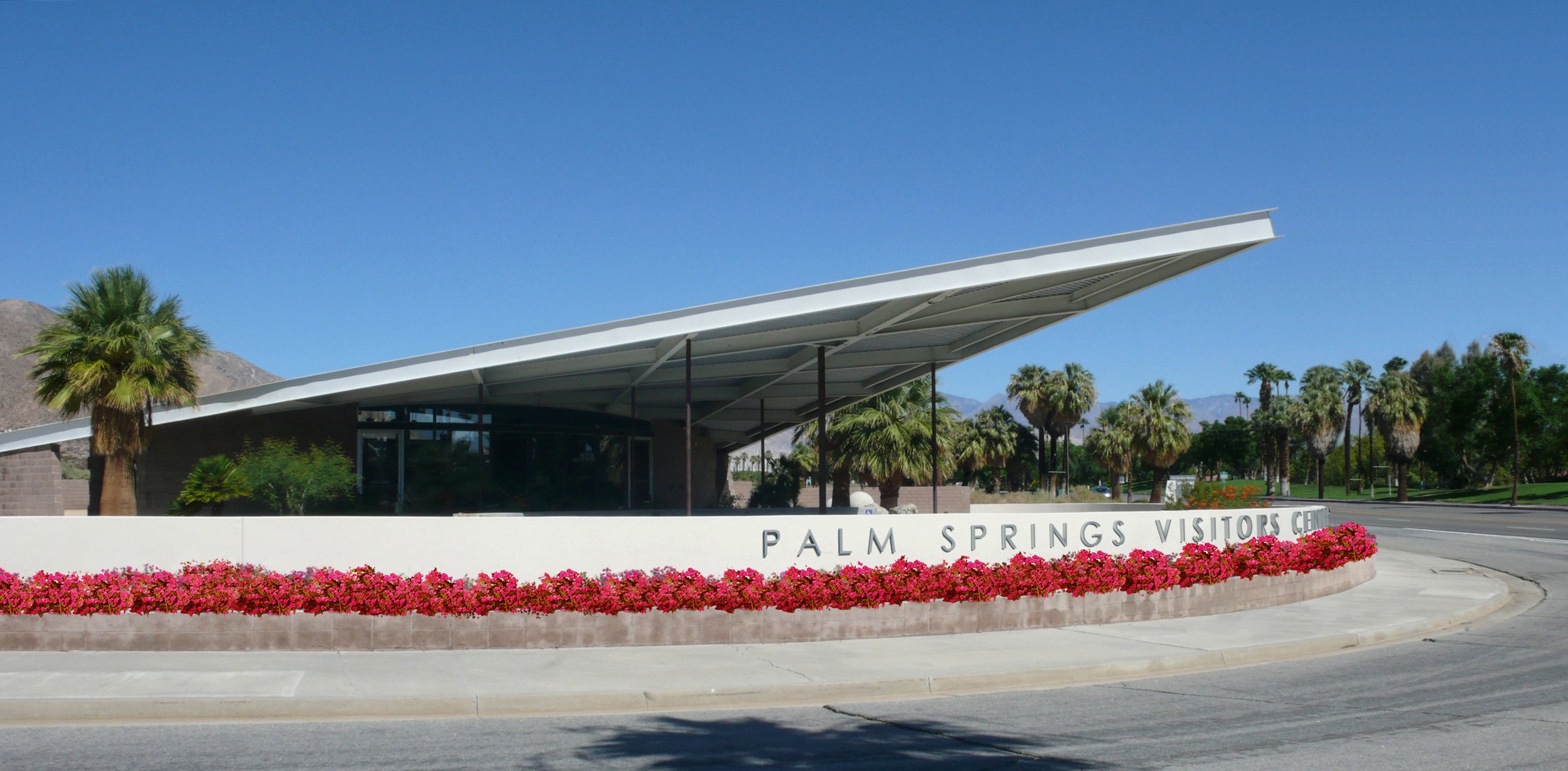
- Palm Springs Visitor Center, 2014
- Location: 2901 North Palm Canyon; Palm Springs, California; United States
- Coordinates: 33.8584°N 116.5581°W
- Built: 1965
- Architect: Albert Frey; Robson C. Chambers
- Architectural style: Desert modern
- NRHP reference No.: 15000645
- Added to NRHP: September 28, 2015

The Tramway Gas Station is a landmark former Enco service station in Palm Springs, California, United States, so named because of its location at the foot of Tramway Road, the lone road leading to the base of the Palm Springs Aerial Tramway. It was intended to be the first Palm Springs building visitors saw when approaching the city from the north via California State Route 111.

The building, with its distinctive, cantilevered, wedge-shaped canopy (referred to as a hyperbolic paraboloid on a historic marker mounted on the building) was built in 1965 and designed by Albert Frey and Robson C. Chambers. It is considered to be a prime example of modernist architecture.

The station had closed by the mid-1990s, and its fate was in doubt until its 2000 purchase by a private interest, who erected a wall around the property and converted it into an art gallery. Since 2003 it has been operated by the Palm Springs Bureau of Tourism as the Palm Springs Visitor Center. The building was listed on the National Register of Historic Places in 2015.

== See also ==
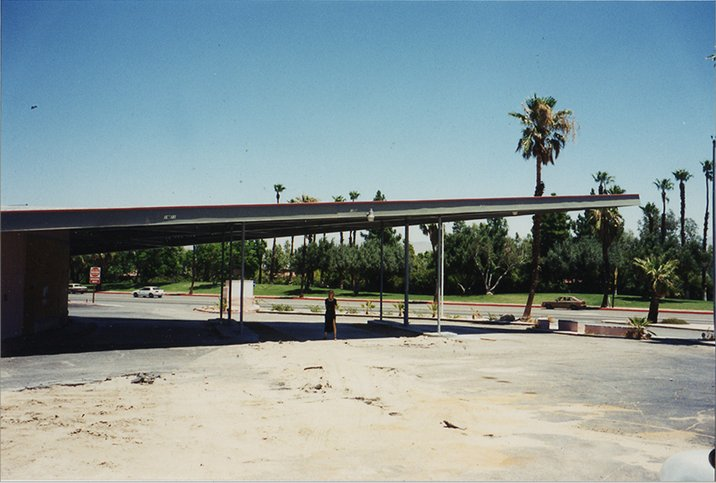
Derelict Tramway Gas Station in 1997 before being converted into a sculpture gallery

- North Shore Beach and Yacht Club
