= Palm Springs Aerial Tramway =

Aerial Tramway

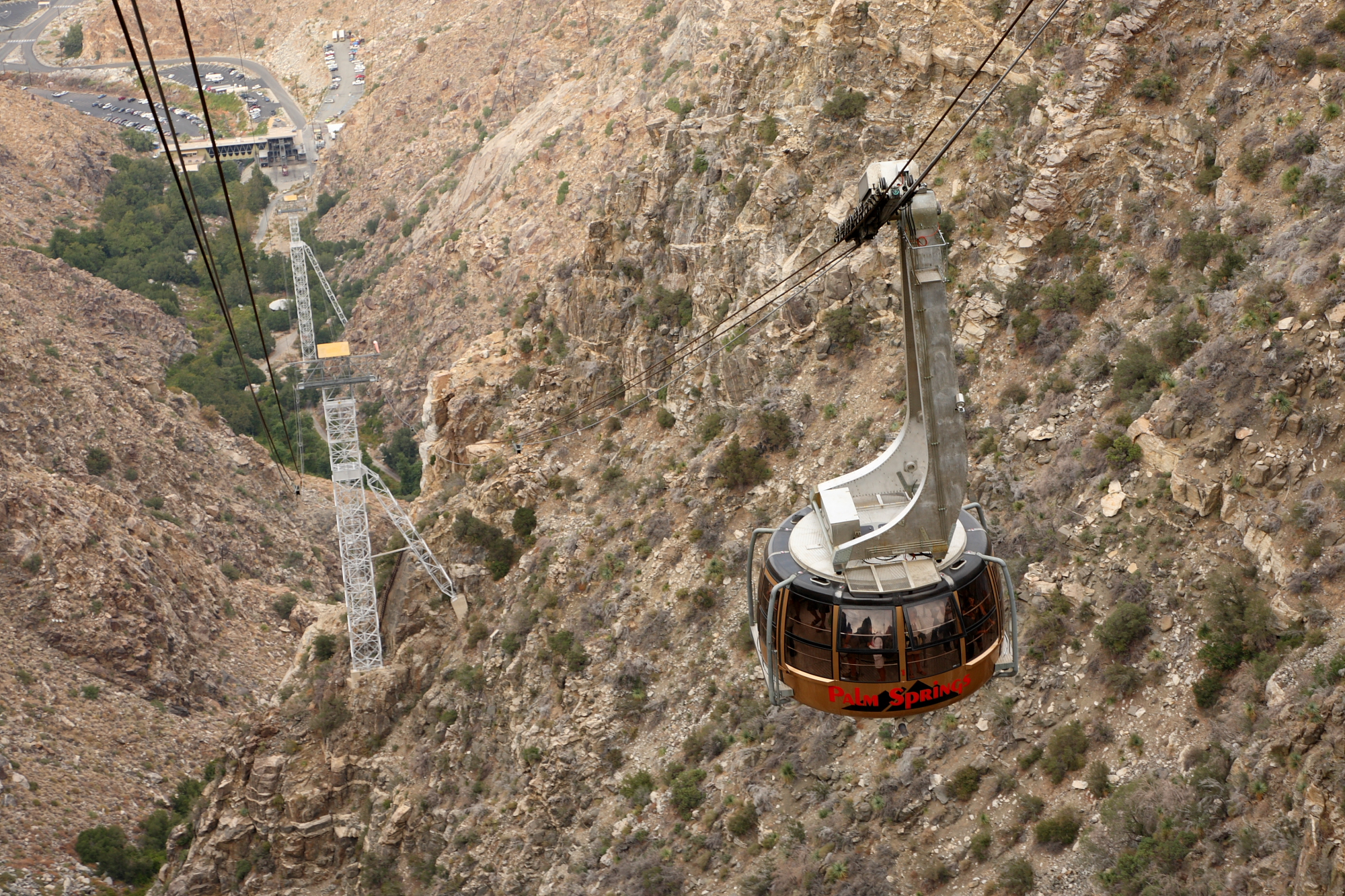
- A car climbing from the valley station below
- Interactive map of Palm Springs Aerial Tramway

Overview
- Status: Operational
- Location: Palm Springs, California
- Country: United States
- Coordinates: 33.8372°N 116.6142°W
- Termini: Valley Station; Mountain Station
- Elevation: lowest: 2,643 feet (806 m) highest: 8,516 feet (2,596 m)
- No. of stations: 2
- Website: http://www.pstramway.com

Operation
- Carrier capacity: 80
- Trip duration: 10 minutes

Technical features
- Aerial lift type: Aerial tramway

The Palm Springs Aerial Tramway in Palm Springs, California, is the largest rotating aerial tramway in the world. It was opened in September 1963 as a way of getting from the floor of the Coachella Valley to near the top of San Jacinto Peak and was constructed in rugged Chino Canyon. Before its construction, the only way to the top of the mountain was to hike hours from Idyllwild. The rotating cars were added in 2000.

== Route ==
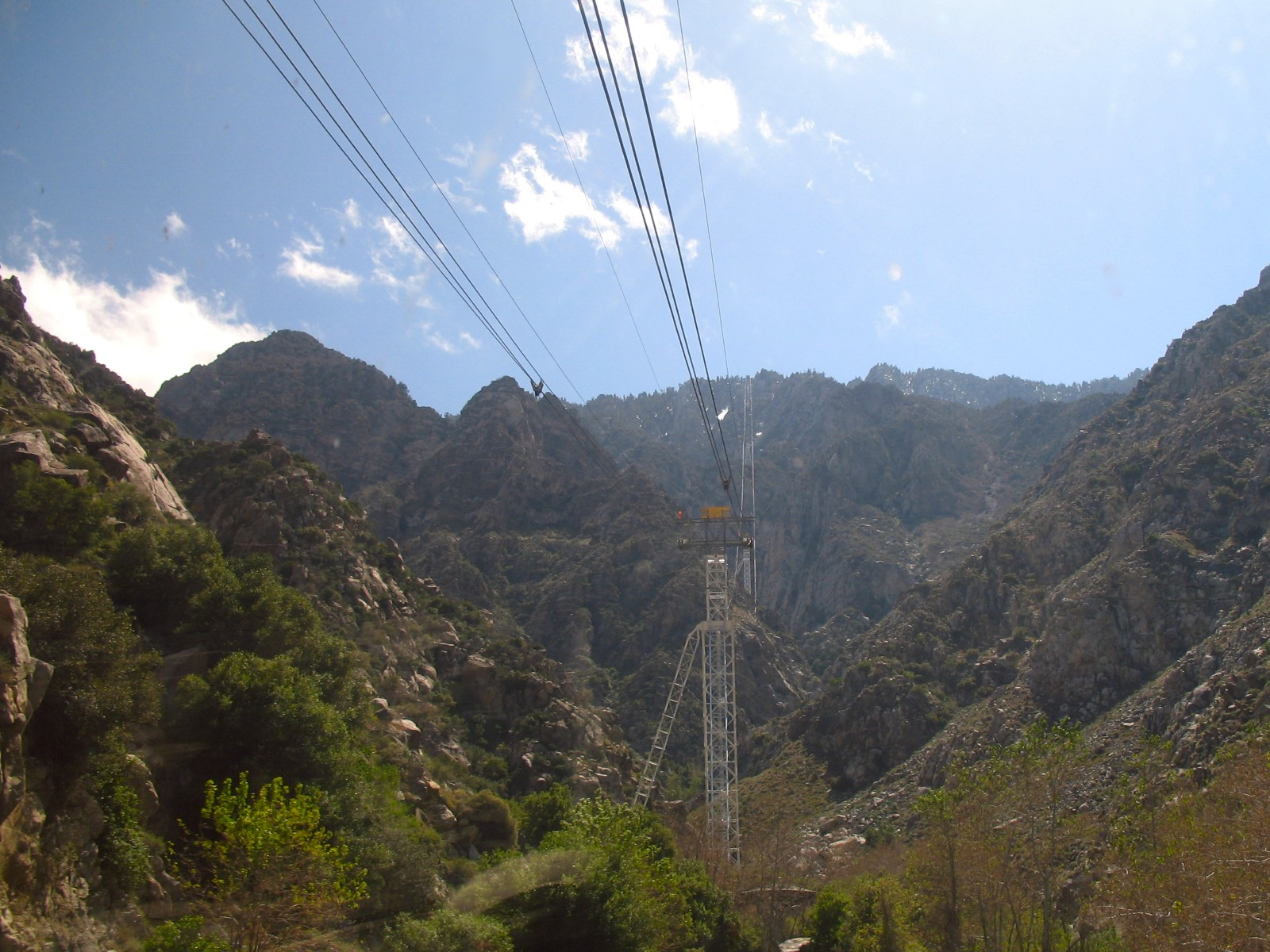
Looking up towards the Mountain Station from the Valley Station

The approximately 10 minute ride begins at the Valley Station at 2,643 feet (806 m) above sea level and passes up a sheer mountain face through five life zones (biomes) on its way to the Mountain Station (coordinates: 33.8130°N 116.6385°W) at 8,516 feet (2,596 m) above sea level. Travelers start in the Colorado Desert and arrive in the alpine wilderness of Long Valley and Mount San Jacinto State Park. The air can be as much as 40 °F (22 °C) cooler at the top than in the desert.

The floor of the 18-foot-diameter (5.5 m) aerial tram cars rotates constantly, making two complete revolutions throughout the duration of the journey so that the passengers can see in all directions without moving.

The view at the top can stretch northward for more than 200 miles (320 km) on a clear day, all the way to Mount Charleston north of Las Vegas, Nevada. Views to the east and west can stretch as far as 75 miles (121 km). California's Salton Sea is plainly visible to the southeast.

As it was in 1963, the only way up the mountain to deliver supplies and water is via the aerial tram cars themselves. Supplies are loaded into the passenger area before the attraction's opening while fresh water is pumped into storage tanks in the car's underbelly.

== History ==
=== Construction ===
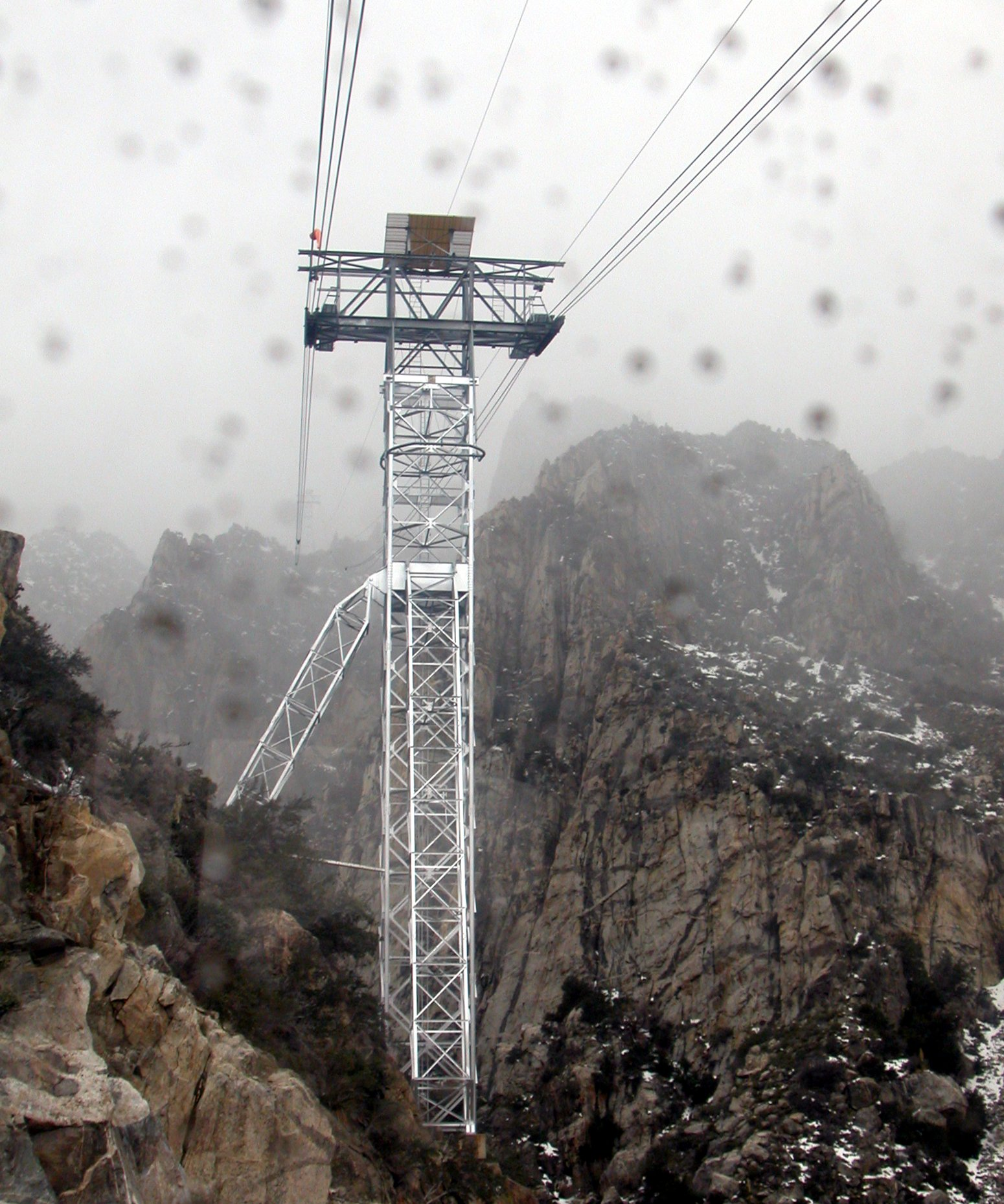
A steel truss pylon for the tramway

The aerial tram was first proposed by electrical engineer Francis Freeman Crocker (1901-1992), during a 1935 trip to Banning, California with the Desert Sun newspaper publisher Carl Barkow. During the heat of the day, Crocker's gaze fell upon the snow-capped, 10,804-foot-high (3,293 m) peak of Mount San Jacinto to the east. Crocker then proposed building an aerial tram up the face of Chino Canyon, an idea that one newspaper dubbed "Crocker's Folly".

Toward the end of the decade, Crocker named the co-manager of the Palm Springs Desert Inn, O. Earl Coffman, to chair the construction committee.

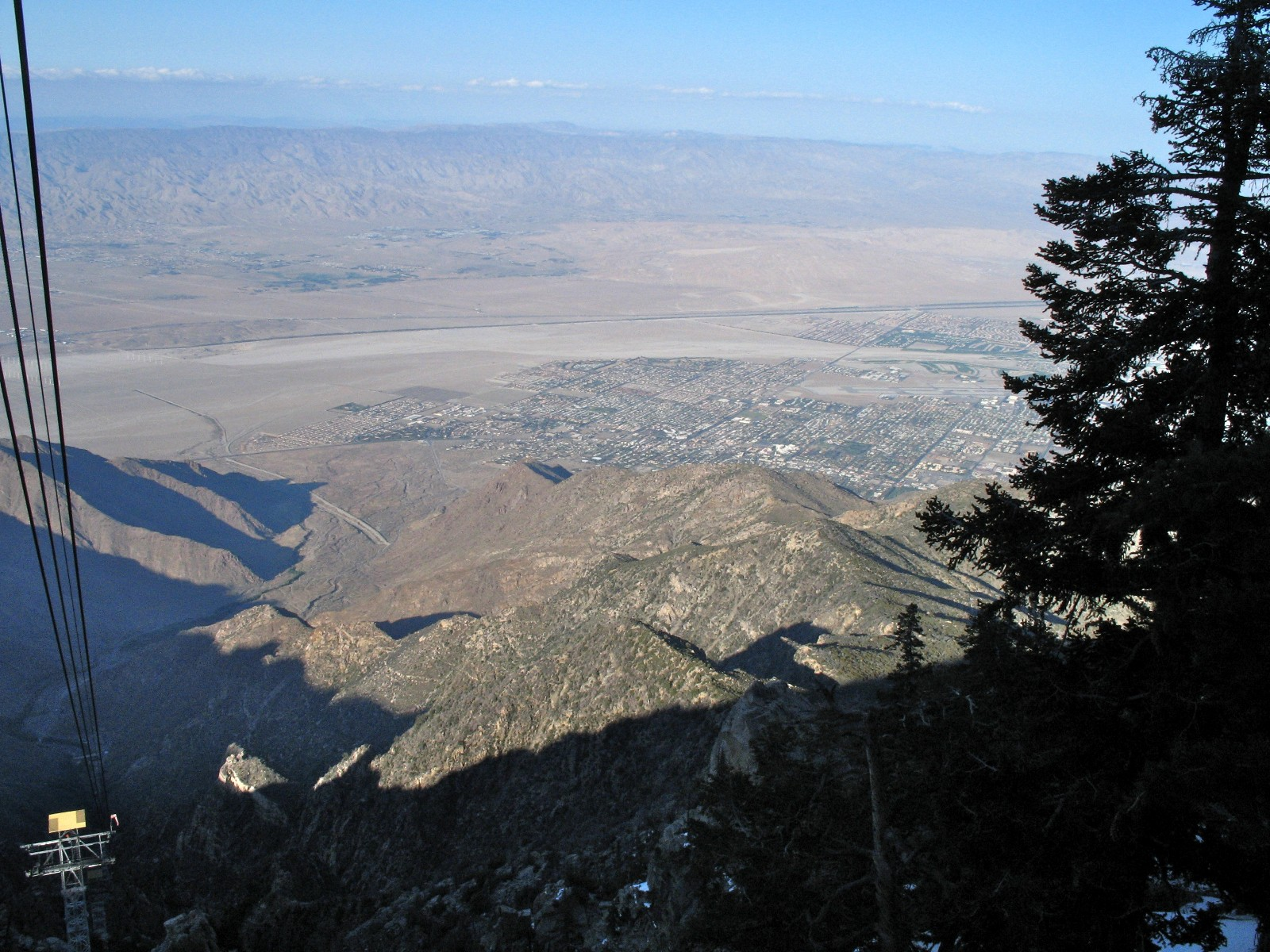
A view of the Coachella Valley from a tramway car. Palm Springs, the San Andreas Fault, and Interstate 10 are visible.

Both World War II and the Korean War shelved the project, and construction finally began in 1960. The unprecedented use of helicopters in the construction of four of the aerial tram's five towers helped the Palm Springs Aerial Tramway earn a reputation as a great engineering feat. It was opened in September 1963.

In 1965, the Tramway Gas Station was built at the foot of the road leading to the tramway. The gas station was designed by Albert Frey and Robson Chambers.

Since 2003 the Tramway Gas Station has operated as the Palm Springs Visitor Center.

In 2000, the original tram cars were replaced by new cars that rotate slowly, offering riders a 360° panoramic view of Chino Canyon and the desert valley floor. The original aerial tram cars are now on static display near the entrance to the Valley Station.

With a maximum capacity of 80 passengers, Palm Springs is the largest of the four rotating aerial trams in the world. The other "Rotair" aerial trams are located in Cape Town, South Africa, Titlis, Switzerland and Sky Way, Courmayeur, Italy.

=== Incidents ===
In 1963, a tram car became stuck for 13½ hours because of an electrical problem in the control room.

In June 1984, a tram car was headed down the mountain when a bolt from a shock absorber snapped, causing a 30-pound (14 kg) piece of metal to crash through a Plexiglas window along the car's roof. Tram passenger Elaine Tseko of Ontario, California, was struck by the piece and later died as a result of the injury.

In September 1984, during routine maintenance, an auxiliary cable snapped and wrapped around the main cable tracks. The Desert Sun newspaper reported that if the broken cable hadn't wedged itself under the main track cables, a rescue car with the tram's workmen in it could have plummeted down the mountain into the lower tramway station. "Without the snag," a state investigator said, "those two men wouldn't be with us today."

In 1985, a flash flood buried vehicles parked in the Valley Station's parking lot in mud and tore up about three-quarters of a mile of Tramway Road. Stranded passengers had to be airlifted from the area.

On July 31, 1991, a school bus carrying 45 Girl Scouts and eight adult leaders was descending Tramway Road when it gained speed, left the roadway near the bottom of the grade, plunged down an embankment, and struck several large boulders. The driver and six passengers were killed, and the remaining 47 occupants were injured. The National Transportation Safety Board determined the probable cause to be overheated, improperly adjusted brakes and the driver's failure to downshift into a sufficiently low gear during the descent.

In October 2003, a steel cable broke, causing a mechanical failure that left a tram car with more than 50 passengers hanging in mid-air, and around 100 passengers stranded at the Mountain station for 4½ hours. Tramway officials sought a rescue helicopter but could not locate one. The Desert Sun later reported that a inspector had discovered the break in the cable nearly two hours before the failure occurred, but the tramway was not closed.

== Station architecture ==
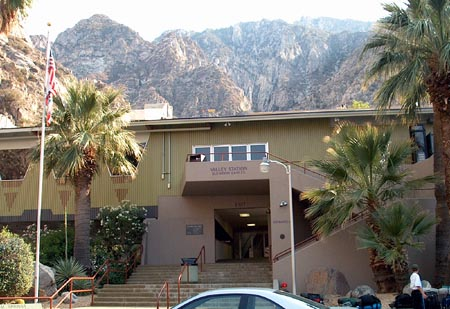
Valley Station, the lower of the tramway's two stations

Both tramway stations were designed by notable mid-century modern architects.

The Valley Station was designed by Albert Frey with assistance from his business partners John Porter Clark and Robson Chambers. The building has a bridge-like structure that straddles a gully, allowing water, and the occasional boulder rolling down from the mountain to pass underneath without damaging the building. Extensive use of glass affords passengers waiting to board a tram views of the mountain they are about to scale. The firm of Clark, Frey and Chambers also designed the iconic Tramway Gas Station at the bottom of the entrance road.

The Mountain Station was designed by architect E. Stewart Williams, with assistance from his brother and business partner H. Roger Williams. The lodge style building is listed on the National Register of Historic Places.

== Gallery ==
Trambi: an early mascot for the Tramway

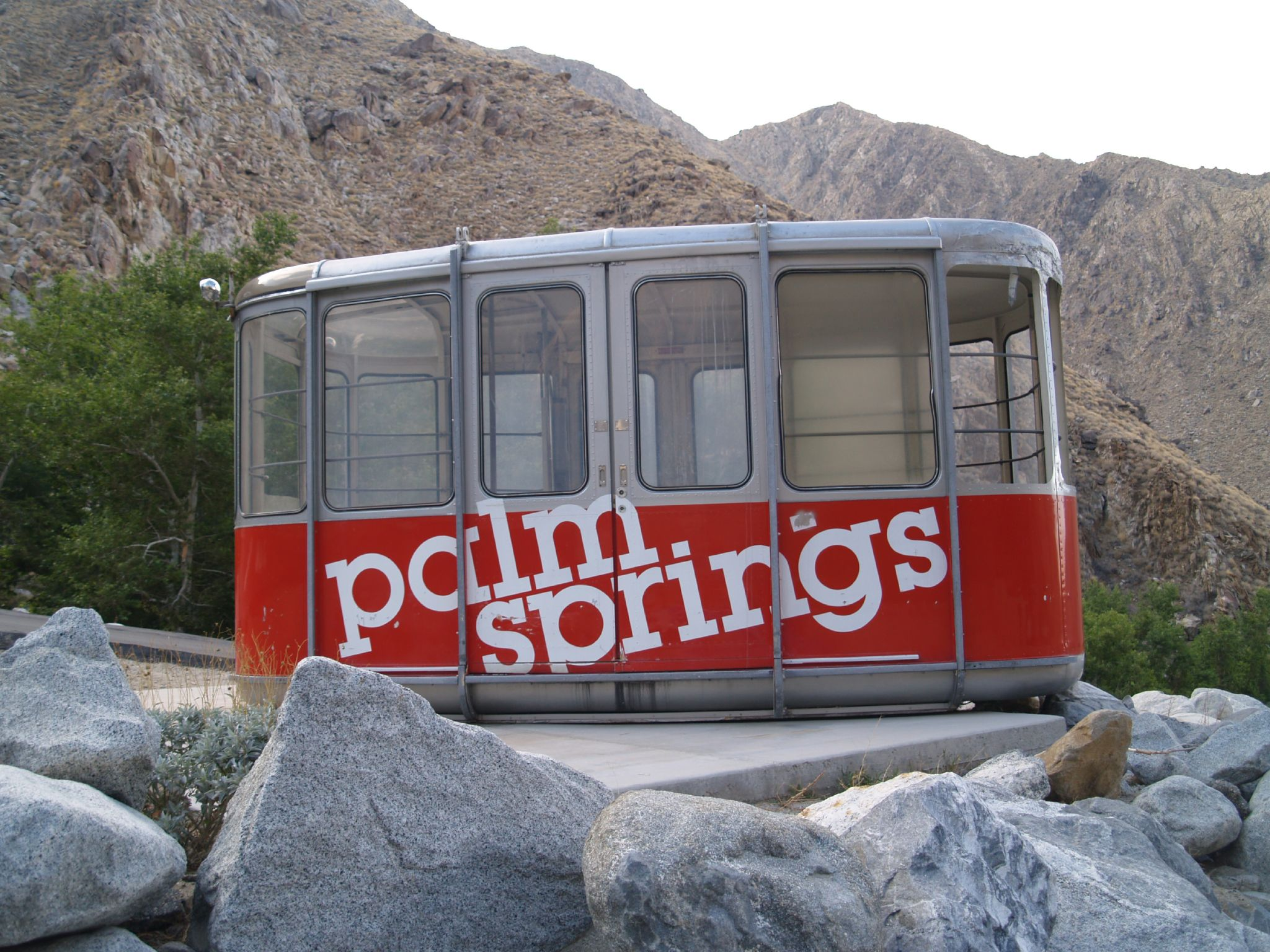
An original aerial tram car on static display as seen in 2007

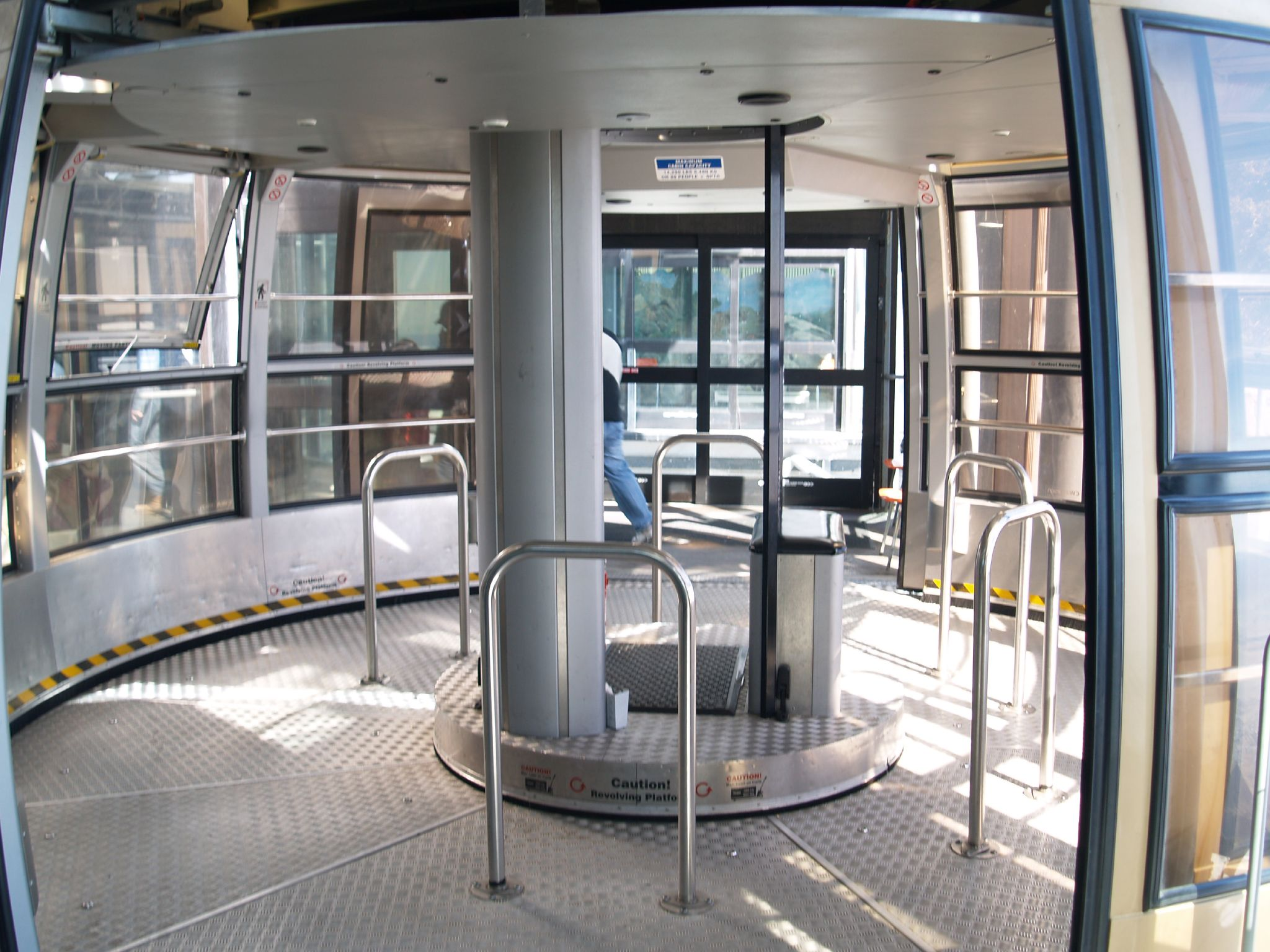
Interior of one of the current tram cars, with revolving floor

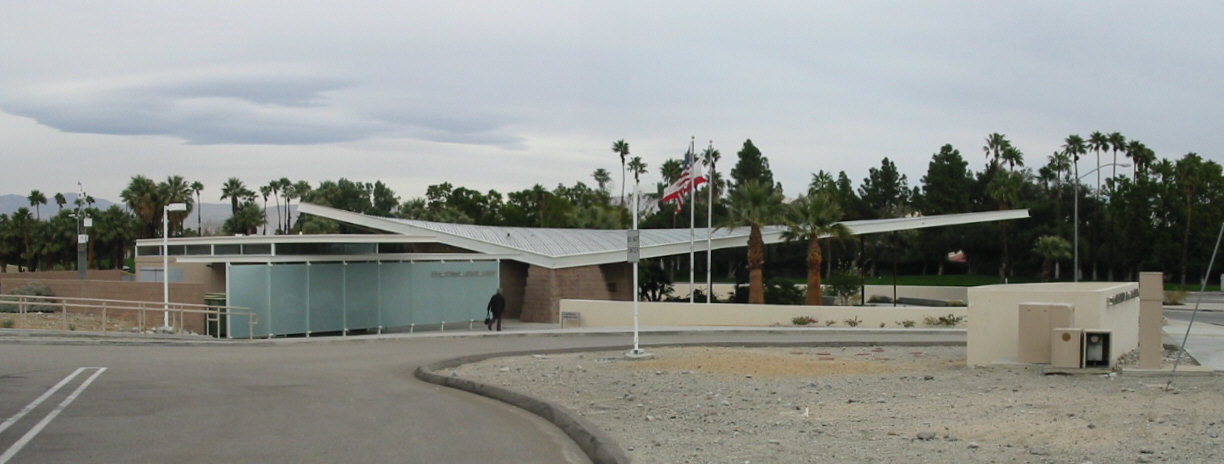
Palm Springs Visitors Center, originally designed as the Tramway Gas Station

== Animal park ==
In the late 1960s, the Tramway Animal Park, now defunct, was owned and operated by Animal Behavior Laboratories of Los Angeles. It was located on 10 acres (40,000 m^{2}) of land leased from the Mt. San Jacinto Winter Park Authority. A portion of the park included a fenced area for reindeer that were allowed to roam throughout Chino Canyon. In addition to reindeer, the park featured tame deer, cockatoos, two dolphins named Buttons and Beau, macaques, and various other species of primates (including "Suzie, the show-off chimpanzee"). The animals performed in regularly scheduled shows.

== In popular culture ==
The tramway has been featured in many films and television programs since its inception.

In the fall of 1966, two episodes of I Spy were filmed in Palm Springs, one of which included footage of the tramway (Season 2, Episode 1), and the other included a brief discussion of the tramway (Season 2, Episode 8).

On September 16, 1967, the first episode of the TV show Mannix was broadcast with the tramway as a scene in the show.

The fourth and final Matt Helm movie, The Wrecking Crew, contained an action scene filmed at the tram station that featured actors Dean Martin, Nancy Kwan, and Sharon Tate.

On October 2, 1971, an episode of Mission: Impossible (Season 6, Episode 3: "The Tram"), filmed at the tramway, first aired.

The 1972 Columbo episode "Short Fuse" featured the tramway as the location of the climactic scene at the end of the show where Columbo tricks the murderer into revealing his guilt.

The 1974 television movie Skyway to Death, shown on the ABC Movie of the Week, had its exterior scenes filmed at the tramway.

In 1995 the Beverly Hills, 90210 season 5 finale "P.S. I Love You" features the tramway as a location where a main character is threatened with being thrown off it. It features the base station, the ride up, and parts of the surrounding scenery.

In the 2010 Life After People episode "Holiday Hell", the dry desert environment allows the tramway to survive for 120 years without maintenance; however, corrosion eventually sets in on the cable and towers, leading it to collapse into Chino Canyon.

In 2013's Grand Theft Auto V, the tram in the game known as "Pala Springs Aerial Tramway" is modeled after the tramway.
