= Villahermosa (disambiguation) =

Villahermosa is a city in Mexico and the capital of Tabasco state.

Villahermosa may also refer to:

- Villahermosa, Ciudad Real, a town in Castile-La Mancha, Spain
- Villahermosa del Campo, a town in Teruel, Aragon, Spain
- Villahermosa del Río, a town in Castellón, Valencia, Spain
- Villahermosa, Tolima, a town and municipality in Colombia
- Villa Hermosa, a town in the La Romana province of the Dominican Republic
- Villa Hermosa (Palm Springs), California, a private residential complex designed by Albert Frey
