= Flight 28 =

Flight 28 may refer to:

- American Airlines Flight 28, crashed on 23 October 1942
- British Airtours Flight 28M, fire on the ground on 22 August 1985
