= Chino Canyon (California) =

Desert canyon in California

Coordinates: 33°51′52″N 116°34′16″W

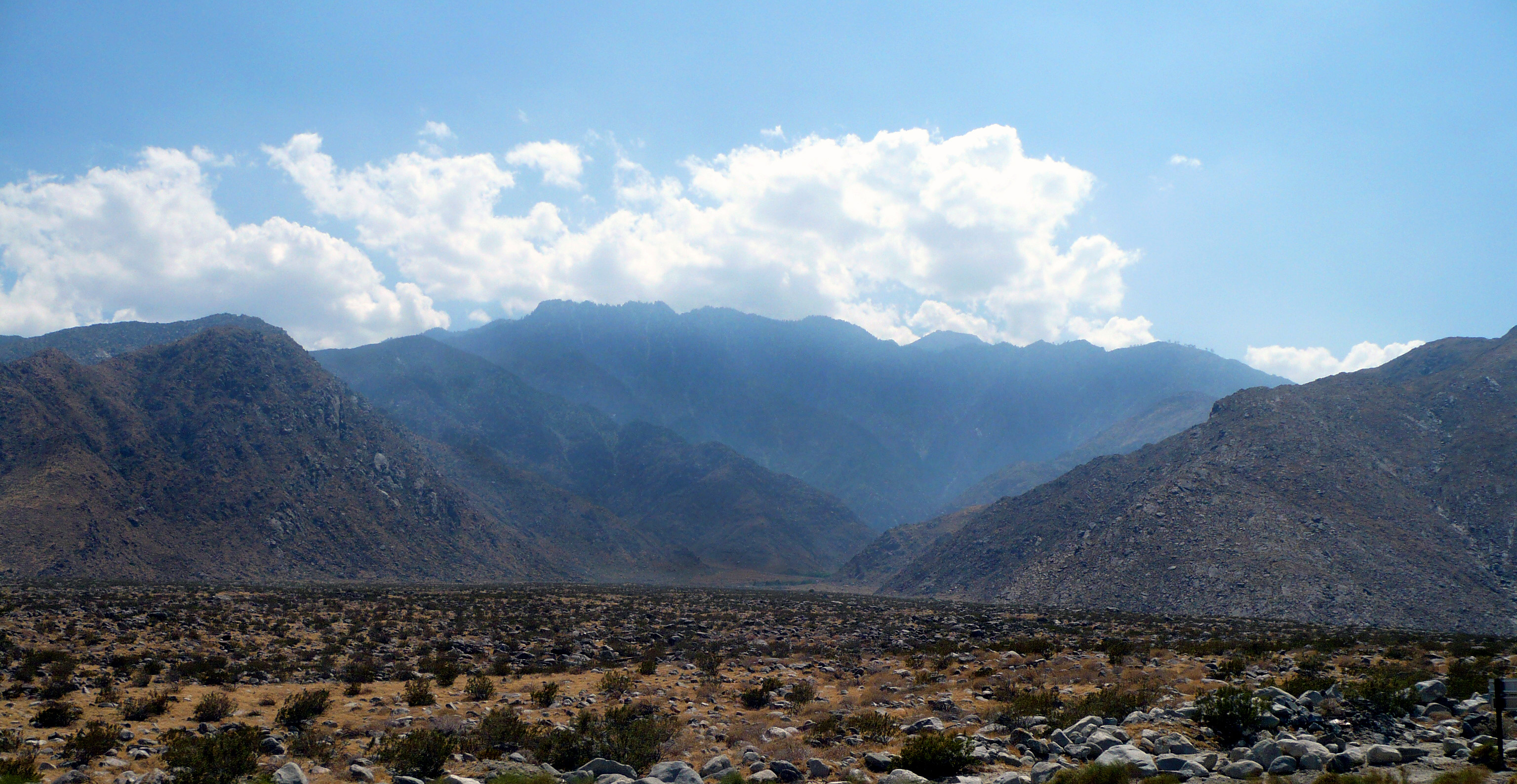
Chino Canyon Palm Springs, California, as observed from Palm Canyon Drive

Chino Canyon is a 5.5-mile-long (8.9 km) desert canyon in Riverside County, California, United States. It is one of the steepest canyons in North America, dropping from over 8,500 feet (2,600 m) at the south rim to less than 2,700 feet (820 m) on the valley floor in less than a mile. The Palm Springs Aerial Tramway was built in the canyon in 1963 to quickly transport people from the valley floor to the top of the mountain. After it was redesigned in 2000, it became the largest rotating aerial tramway in the world.

The canyon is located in the northern end of the San Jacinto Mountains at the northwestern end of the Coachella Valley. Its associated stream is a tributary of the Whitewater River. The upper reaches of the canyon are bordered by Mount San Jacinto State Park, while the lower end terminates near California State Highway 111, and is being encroached by the outskirts of Palm Springs, California.

In 1942, Chino Canyon was the site of a mid-air collision between American Airlines Flight 28 and a United States Army Air Forces B-34 bomber.

== Chino Canyon Creek ==
Chino Canyon is a desert canyon fed by springs. These produce a waterfall and a stream that peaks out at about 5.4 ft^{3} per second (0.15 m^{3} per second). The stream flows under the Aerial Tramway Valley Station and later dries up about 3.5 miles down the canyon.
