= Albert Frey (architect) =

Swiss-born American modernist architect (1903–1998)

- Born: October 18, 1903; Zürich, Switzerland
- Died: November 14, 1998 (aged 95); Palm Springs, California, U.S.
- Education: Technikum Winterthur
- Occupation: Architect
- Buildings: Raymond Loewy House; Palm Springs Aerial Tramway; Tramway Gas Station; Villa Hermosa

Albert Frey (/ˈfreɪ/ FRAY; October 18, 1903 – November 14, 1998) was a Swiss-born architect who established a style of modernist architecture centered on Palm Springs, California, United States, that came to be known as "desert modernism".

== European years ==
Born in Zurich, Switzerland, Frey received his architecture diploma in 1924 from the Technikum engineering school in Winterthur, Switzerland. There, Frey trained in traditional building construction and received technical instruction rather than design instruction in the then popular Beaux-Arts style. Prior to receiving his diploma, Frey apprenticed with the architect A. J. Arter in Zurich and worked in construction during his school vacations.

It was also around this time that Frey became aware of the Dutch De Stijl movement, the German Bauhaus school and movement, and the modernism movement developing in Brussels. All would prove to be significant influences to Frey's later work.

From 1924 through 1928, Frey worked on various architectural projects in Belgium. In 1928, Frey secured a position in the Paris atelier of the noted International Style architect Le Corbusier and Pierre Jeanneret. Frey was one of two full-time employees of the atelier and coworkers included Josep Lluís Sert, Kunio Maekawa, and Charlotte Perriand. During his period of working for Le Corbusier, Frey worked on the Villa Savoye project and other significant projects. In 1928, Frey left the atelier to take up work in the United States, but continued to maintain a friendship with Le Corbusier for many years.

== American years ==
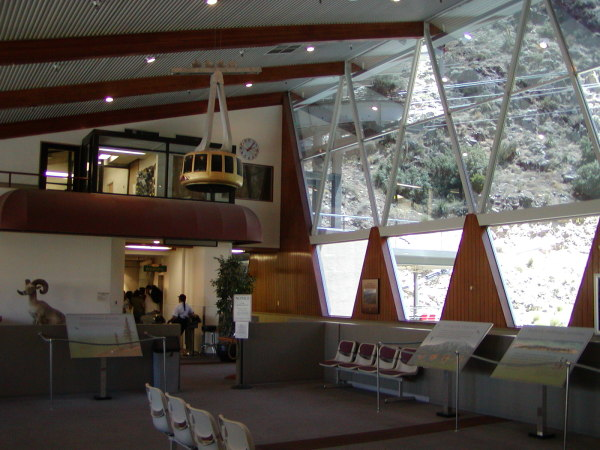
Interior, Palm Springs Aerial Tramway

In September 1930, Frey returned to New York from another visit to France. Frey, the first architect in America to have worked directly with Le Corbusier, now began working with the American architect A. Lawrence Kocher who was also the managing editor of Architectural Record. Their collaboration would last until 1935, and they would reunite for a brief collaboration again in 1938.

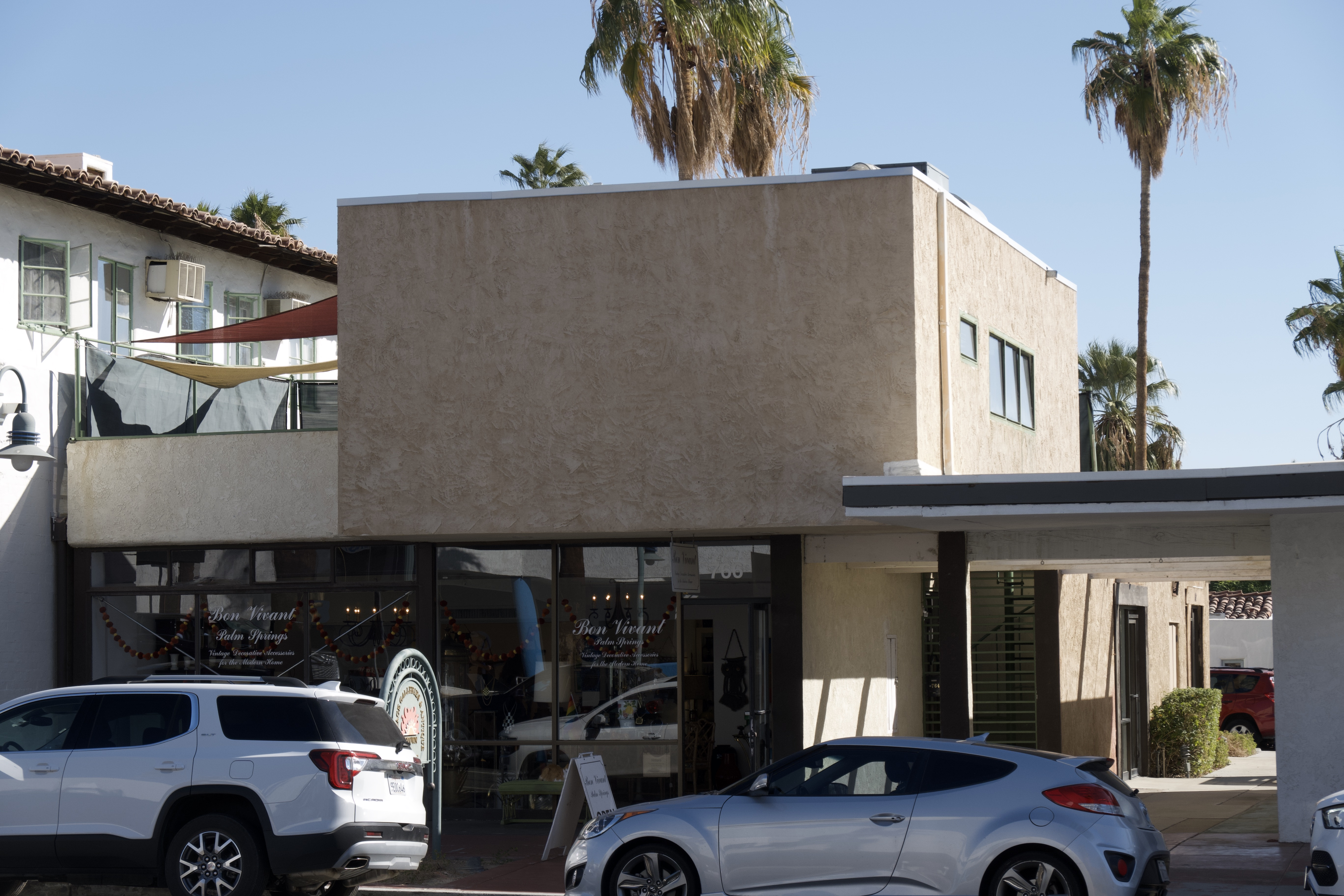
Kocher-Samson Building, 1934

Although only four buildings were built by the pair, they contributed significantly to the American modernist movement through their numerous articles published in Architectural Record on urban planning, the modernist aesthetic, and technology. One collaboration was the 1931 Aluminaire House, designed for an exhibition, and later sold to New York architect Wallace K. Harrison for $1000. Harrison used it as a guest house on his Long Island property for years. Another of their commissions was an office/apartment dual-use building for Kocher's brother, Dr. J. J. Kocher of Palm Springs. This project introduced Frey to the California desert, which was to become his home and the backdrop for most of his subsequent work.

From 1935 to 1937, Frey worked with John Porter Clark (1905–1991), a Cornell-educated architect, under the firm name of Van Pelt and Lind Architects as both were unlicensed in California. In 1937, Frey briefly returned to the east coast to work on the Museum of Modern Art in New York. While in New York, Frey married Marion Cook, a writer he had met in Palm Springs. In 1938, Frey and his wife went to France and returned to America on the Normandie, a floating art deco masterpiece.

Upon completion of his work on the Museum of Modern Art in 1939, Frey and Marion returned to California to resume his collaboration with Clark, which would continue for nearly twenty more years. Frey and Marion divorced in 1945 and neither remarried.

Palm Springs City Hall (1952-1957)

At the end of World War II Palm Springs' population almost tripled, and the city experienced a building boom. Known as an escape for the Hollywood elite and a winter haven for east coast industrialists, Palm Springs emerged post-war as a resort community for a broader segment of the American populace with more leisure time than any previous generation.

Frey and Clark were well positioned to capitalize on this, and both the city and their firm benefited from an unprecedented period of construction. Significant buildings by Frey during this period include the following:

- Kocher-Samson Building
- Cree House II
- Frey's private residences, Frey House I and Frey House II
- Loewy House, built for industrial designer Raymond Loewy
- North Shore Beach and Yacht Club at North Shore, Salton Sea – renovated (May 2010)
- Palm Springs Aerial Tramway Valley Station
- Palm Springs City Hall (1952)
- Salton Bay Yacht Club, Salton City
- Villa Hermosa (1946) – updated in 1956 by Frey & renovated in 2003
- Tramway Gas Station, with an iconic "flying wedge" canopy, at the entrance to the Palm Springs Tramway, now used as a visitors center.

Frey died in Palm Springs, aged 95, and was buried at Welwood Murray Cemetery.

== Legacy ==
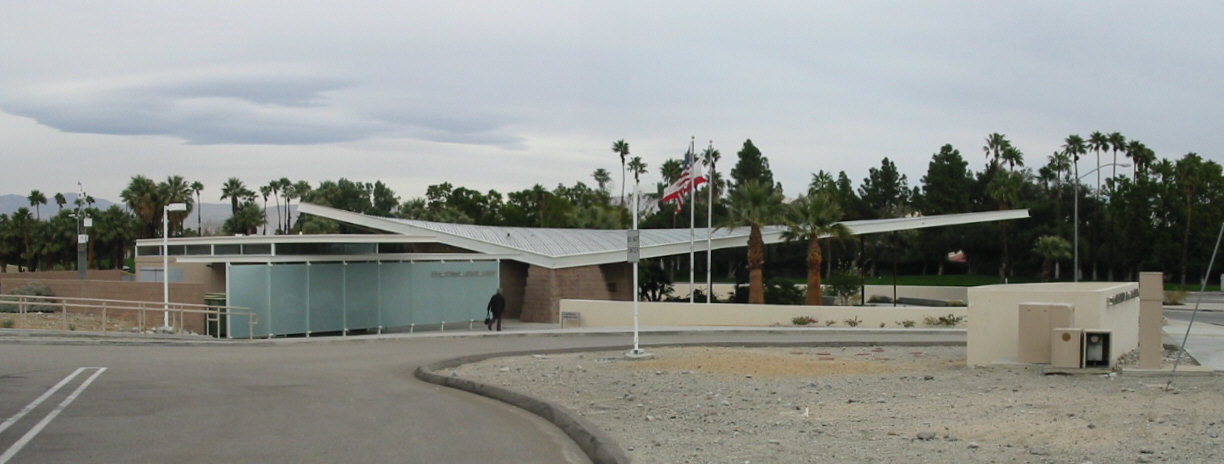
The historic Tramway Gas Station serves as a visitors center

After some consideration, a shopping center at the corner of Sunrise Way and Ramon Road in Palm Springs that bore a Frey-designed façade was demolished and replaced with an entirely new center that incorporates architectural touches in Frey's style. Newly designed structures along Palm Canyon Drive are now being fitted with Frey-styled accents, including butterfly rooflines, glass walls, rock facings and exposed ceilings.

Frey's buildings helped establish Palm Springs as a progressive desert mecca for innovative modern architecture during the 1950s, 1960s and 1970s. He produced designs for the spectrum of architectural commissions, from bespoke custom homes to institutional and public buildings, most of which are still in use today.

In comparison with his contemporary and fellow European transplant, Richard Neutra, Frey's designs are more integrated into the surrounding landscape and draw from the local surroundings for color and metaphor. In contrast to Neutra, Frey's designs are more commercial and less philosophically dogmatic, and hence more accessible. By embracing the American idiom while incorporating the modernist philosophy influenced by Le Corbusier, Frey produced a new regional vernacular. In 1996, he was awarded the Neutra Award for Professional Excellence.

A Golden Palm Star on the Palm Springs Walk of Stars was dedicated to Frey in 2010. The Palm Springs Art Museum mounted an exhibit entitled "Albert Frey: Inventive Modernist" scheduled to run January 13, 2024 – June 3, 2024, curated and designed by Brad Dunning, in conjunction with their reconstruction of Aluminaire House.
