= Aluminaire House =

Building preserved in Palm Springs, United States

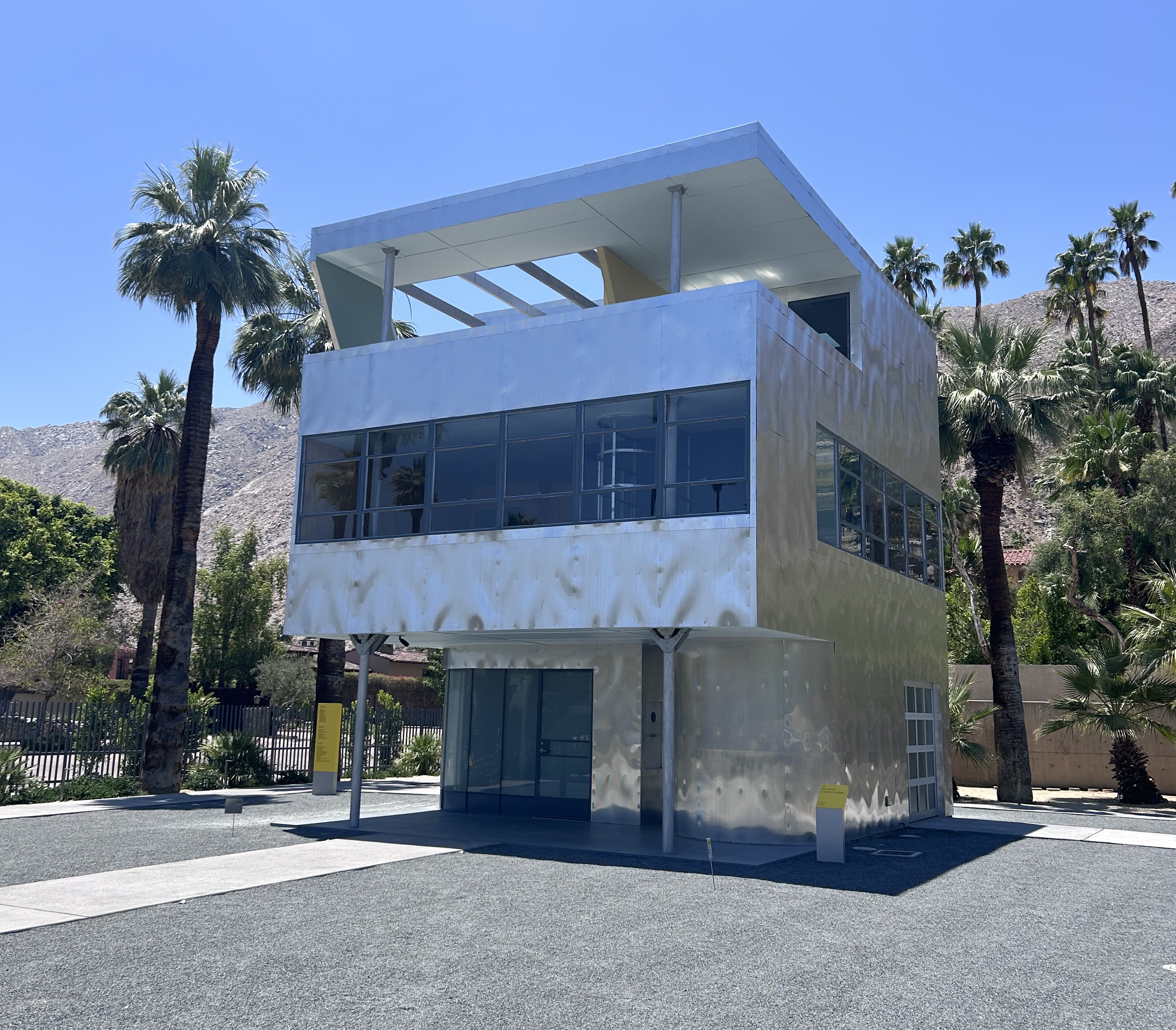
- Aluminaire House in Palm Springs, California, June 2025

General information
- Status: Preserved
- Architectural style: International
- Location: Palm Springs, California, U.S.
- Completed: 1931

Technical details
- Floor count: 3

Design and construction
- Architects: A. Lawrence Kocher; Albert Frey

The Aluminaire House is a three-story house designed as a case study by architects A. Lawrence Kocher and Albert Frey in April 1931. Made of donated materials and built in ten days, it was the first all-metal house in the United States. After being displayed at architecture shows, it was installed at multiple locations in New York, and was later transferred to the Palm Springs Art Museum, where it is currently on view as an exhibit.

== History ==
The Aluminaire House was shown in the Grand Central Palace exhibition hall on Lexington Avenue in New York City as part of the Architectural and Allied Arts Exhibition. In 1932, the house was exhibited again, this time at the Architectural League of New York show sponsored by the Museum of Modern Art (MoMA). The MOMA show was titled The International Style - Architecture Since 1922, which became the basis of a book by Philip Johnson and Henry-Russell Hitchcock, The International Style, a manifesto for the International Style of architecture.

After the early exhibitions, the house was sold to architect Wallace K. Harrison for $1,000 (equivalent to $23,598 in 2025), who disassembled it and moved it to his Long Island estate, where it became the core of an extensive complex. By 1940, the so-called "Tin House" was once again disassembled and moved to another portion of the property, where it became a guest house.

The property was subdivided by new buyers in the 1980s who planned to demolish the Aluminaire House. An attempt to designate the house as a landmark failed, but the owners agreed to donate the house to the New York Institute of Technology, which reassembled the house on the school's Central Islip campus. After the Central Islip campus was closed, the house was transferred to the Aluminaire House Foundation, disassembled, and put into storage. A 2013 proposal to reassemble the house on a site in Sunnyside Gardens, Queens, as part of a housing development, met with opposition from Sunnyside Gardens residents, who expressed concern that the house's design did not fit with the neighborhood's traditional brick housing. In 2015, it was announced that the Aluminaire House would be moved to Palm Springs, California, home of other works by Frey. In early 2018, the house was placed in a container and shipped to Palm Springs. Initial plans called for it to be rebuilt in a park opposite the Palm Springs Art Museum, pending a $475,000 fund raising effort for its restoration. Assembly of the house at the museum was planned for 2021, but actually began in July of 2023, on a parking lot just south of the museum and with a budget of $2.6 million. Because of its desert location, the museum added air conditioning and weatherproofing. The grand opening was March 23, 2024.

== Description ==
The 1,200-square-foot (110 m^{2}) house is roughly cubic in shape, resting on six columns, with five rooms. Exterior walls consist of corrugated metal sheathing backed by waterproof paper over a structure of two-inch steel angles. The interior finish is thin insulation board covered with fabric.

== See also ==
- Dymaxion House, a contemporary proposal by architect Buckminster Fuller for a mass-produced prefabricated house
