= A. Lawrence Kocher =

American architect, editor, and teacher

A. Lawrence Kocher (July 24, 1885 – June 6, 1969) was an American architect, editor, and teacher. He was a pioneering advocate of modern architecture and the preservation of historic landmarks

== Education and career ==
In 1909, he studied Bachelor of Arts in history at Stanford University. Subsequently, in 1916 he studied Master of Arts in Pennsylvania State College (M.A. 1916). He is graduated also from Massachusetts Institute of Technology and New York University. His extensive education in both history and architecture informed his forward-thinking approach to consolidation between old and new, and led to his appointment as Director of the McIntire School of Art and Architecture at the University of Virginia.

Kocher is best known in his role as managing editor of Architectural Record from 1927 to 1938, and for shifting the focus of the publication from historic European style architecture to modern building methods and design.

In addition to being regarded as a well-known authority on colonial and modern architecture and history, Kocher grew a successful design practice with Swiss architect Albert Frey. Their collaboration resulted in many notable buildings, including the Aluminaire House, the Fort Salonga Colony, and the Studies Building at Black Mountain College in North Carolina

== Partnership with Walter Gropius ==
Kocher's success as managing editor of Architectural Record and his advocacy of affordable housing led to his collegial friendship with Walter Gropius. Gropius, founder of the German Bauhaus School of Design and visionary champion of the international style, discussed the idea of opening a similar school in America with Kocher. Although the school was never created, Kocher was responsible for attaining a teaching position at Harvard University for Gropius, and thus bringing his influence into the United States. Furthermore, when a campus master plan by Gropius and Marcel Breuer for Black Mountain College was dropped in 1940 due to financial constraints, Kocher was approached by the school to develop a more incremental modernist scheme that could be implemented by faculty and students. Kocher was a Professor of Architecture at Black Mountain from 1940 until 1943.

== Partnership with Albert Frey ==
Beginning in the early 1930s, Kocher's partnership with Swiss architect Albert Frey put him at the forefront of architectural design practice. Theirs was one of the few firms working in the International Style in the United States at that time. While the men were both seen as the face of the practice, Frey held the primary design role, while Kocher provided mentoring and final analysis.

== Major projects ==
- Aluminaire House, with Albert Frey, 1931
- Kocher Canvas Weekend House, 1934
- Robert L. and Constance Davison Prefabricated House, 1936
- Davison House, with John Hancock Callender, 1936
- Subhi M. Sadi House, 1936
- Colonel William P. and Betty Bogie House, with William Bogie, 1938
- Studies Building, Black Mountain College, 1941
- Bogie House, with Huson Jackson, 1946

== See also ==
- Mid-century modern
