= Wallace K. Harrison Estate =

Historic house in New York, United States

- U.S. National Register of Historic Places
- Location within New York Location within the United States
- Location: 140 Round Swamp Rd., West Hills, New York
- Coordinates: 40°48′28″N 73°26′30″W
- Area: 11.5 acres (4.7 ha)
- Built: 1929
- Architect: Harrison, Wallace K.
- Architectural style: International Style
- MPS: Huntington Town MRA
- NRHP reference No.: 85002531
- Added to NRHP: September 26, 1985

Wallace K. Harrison Estate is a historic estate located at West Hills in Suffolk County, New York, the home of architect Wallace K. Harrison of the New York firm Harrison & Abramovitz. The estate home is a rambling, one story flat roofed concrete main house with a two-story circular living room near the center. It was built in 1929 in the International style. Also on the estate are a garage, two guest cottages, a studio, and a circular swimming pool. The property was purchased by Harrison and his wife in the early 1930s. Harrison bought a prefabricated house for $1000, the Aluminaire House, designed by A. Lawrence Kocher and Albert Frey for the Architectural League Show of 1931 in New York. He also embarked on the main house, which was initially built as a wing to what was called the "Tin House." As the complex grew the Tin House was relocated and became a guest cottage.

The estate was sold by the Harrisons in 1974 to Hester Diamond, who placed the estate on the National Register of Historic Places. Subsequent owners placed the house for sale amid concerns about potential demolition, but the house was restored by the buyers, with guidance from architects SchappacherWhite. The Aluminaire House was disassembled and acquired by the New York Institute of Technology campus at Central Islip, which reassembled it. The property is to be transferred to a trust dedicated to its maintenance.

It was added to the National Register of Historic Places in 1985.
