= John Porter Clark =

American architect

- Undated photo of Clark
- Born: August 14, 1905; Fort Dodge, Iowa
- Died: June 22, 1991 (aged 85); Riverside County, California
- Occupation: Architect
- Buildings: Palm Springs City Hall, Palm Springs, California

John Porter Clark (1905–1991) was an American architect. He worked with Albert Frey on several projects in Palm Springs, California, and was part of the Van Pelt and Lind firm. He has been referred to as a "mid-century modernist", and credited as one of the pioneers of "Desert Modernism", by using local rock, concrete blocks, metal and glass. His own house, the John Porter Clark House (1939) in Palm Springs, has been described as being in the international style and as one of the earliest examples of residential modern architecture in Southern California.

== Background ==
Clark was born in Fort Dodge, Iowa, in 1905 to John and Mary Boehn Clark. The family relocated to Pasadena, California, by 1920 where Clark received his high school education. He worked part-time for Martson, Van Pelt and Mayberry in Pasadena, and at Silvanus Marston's suggestion, Clark enrolled in Cornell University. He graduated in 1928 with a Bachelor of Architecture. After graduating from Cornell, Clark returned to Pasadena where he apprenticed with Garrett Van Pelt, in the architectural firm of Van Pelt and Lind. While working in Pasadena, Clark met Sally and Culver Nichols, a Pasadena realtor who invited him to relocate to Palm Springs. There was more work at that time going on in the desert, because of the Great Depression. Clark was unlicensed at that time, but with Van Pelt and Lind's permission, he used their license.

In 1935, Clark met Albert Frey, who was in Palm Springs supervising the construction of the Kocher-Samson office building. After the completion of the office building, Clark and Frey formed a partnership and completed eight projects from 1935–1937. Frey left the partnership in 1937 to work on the Museum of Modern Art in New York. Clark then took over as sole proprietor of the business, until Frey returned to Palm Springs in 1939, and they resumed their partnership. In 1940, Clark completed the architect's licensing exam and was able to pursue commercial projects as well as residential projects. Their work was mainly modernist, a style that influenced the architectural scene into the 1960s.

== World War II ==
Clark served in the United States Army Corps of Engineers during World War II, from 1942 to 1945. He reopened the firm and partnership with Frey in 1945. Veterans and their families migrated to the desert after the war, which resulted in a building boom for Palm Springs. Clark and Frey received several commissions from the returning veterans for homes and small businesses during this time.

== After World War II ==
In 1952, Clark and Frey expanded and made Robson Chambers a partner in the firm. Chambers had been an employee since 1946 and had apprenticed with Clark and Frey. In 1956, his last year with the partnership, the Palm Springs City Hall (a Class 1 historic site) was completed. Clark then left the firm to pursue commercial and institutional projects. Clark designed new offices for his business on Luring Drive where he completed several projects, including the Cabazon Library. In 1972, Clark partnered with Stewart and Roger Williams, creating a new firm, Williams, Clark and Williams. Stewart Williams said Clark was not just a designer, but was a salesman, an engineer and "was the most trusted man in the valley...he made people recognize that architects were an important part of the community.”

Clark and Frey remained friends and appeared together in 1986 in a history project sponsored by the Palm Springs Public Library, titled the “Prickly Pear [Video] Interview Series.” Clark died on June 22, 1991, in Riverside County, California, he was 85.

== Projects ==
Partial list of noteworthy projects Clark was involved with:

- John Porter Clark House, Palm Springs, CA
- Public Library, Banning, CA
- City Hall, Palm Springs, CA
- Clark and Frey Architectural Office, Palm Springs, CA
- Desert Hospital, Palm Springs, CA
- Farwell House, Newport Beach, CA
- Guthrie House, Palm Springs, CA
- Halberg House, Palm Springs, CA
- Kellogg Studio, Palm Springs, CA
- La Siesta Court, Palm Springs, CA
- Paul Dougherty Residence, Palm Springs, CA
- Raymond Loewy House, Palm Springs, CA
- Mason House, Palm Springs, CA
- Dr. Welwood Murray Memorial Library, Palm Springs, CA
- Palm Springs Woman's Club, Palm Springs, CA
- Saint Paul's in the Desert, Palm Springs, CA
- San Gorgonio Hospital, Banning, CA
- San Jacinto Hotel, Palm Springs, CA
- University of California, Riverside, Administration Building, Riverside, CA
- Vista Colorado Elementary School, Needles, CA
- Tramway Station
