= Villa Hermosa (Palm Springs, California) =

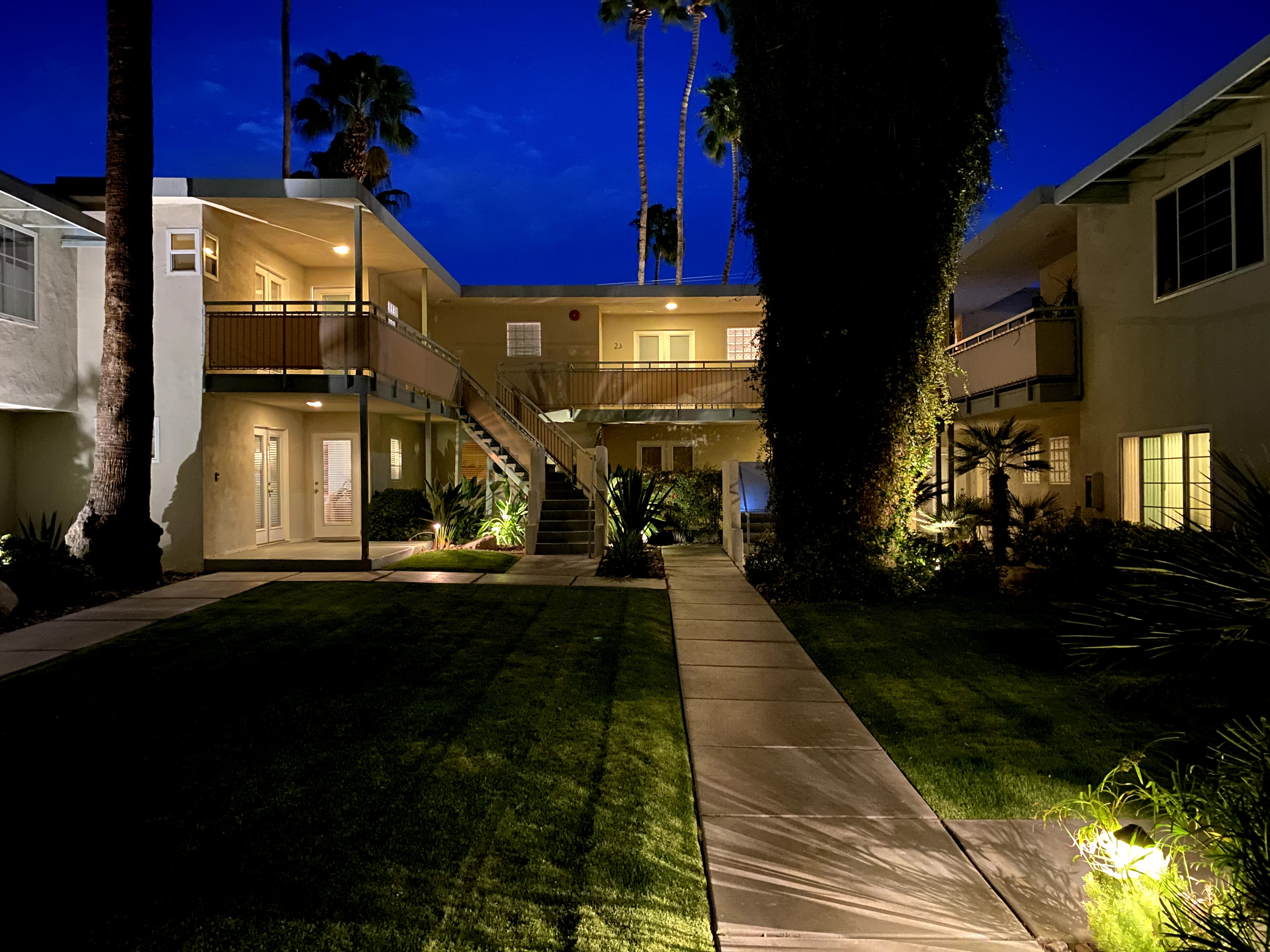
- Villa Hermosa, c. March 2020

General information
- Status: Completed
- Architectural style: International
- Location: 155 W Hermosa Place; Palm Springs, California; United States
- Coordinates: 33°50′08.6″N 116°32′50.9″W
- Completed: 1946

Design and construction
- Architect: Albert Frey

The Villa Hermosa is a mid-century modern private complex in the Old Las Palmas neighborhood of Palm Springs, California, United States. Located at 155 W Hermosa Place, near North Palm Canyon Drive and West El Alameda, it was originally commissioned as a residential hotel for winter visitors by C.K. Fulton in 1946. The property was featured in photos by Julius Shulman in 1947, and subsequently recognized locally as historically significant.

Designed by architect Albert Frey, as "an ode to international style modernism" with railings outfitted with yellow canvas, Villa Hermosa is an "assembly of stacked and terraced apartments that forms a partial enclosure around a garden and a pool that is oriented to a mountain view...with access to all apartments through the garden". In 2001, The New York Times Magazine ranked the building among the top five "most intact and notable" of the 200 projects Frey designed in Palm Springs between 1934 and 1988. Former residents include Edgar J. Kaufmann who rented one of the apartments while Richard Neutra was completing construction on Kaufmann House.

== See also ==
- List of Mid-century Modern Architecture in Palm Springs
