= American Airlines Flight 28 =

1942 mid-air collision

Accident
- Date: October 23, 1942
- Summary: Mid-air collision
- Site: Palm Springs, California, California, U.S.; 33°52′N 116°34′W
- Total fatalities: 12
- Total survivors: 2

First aircraft
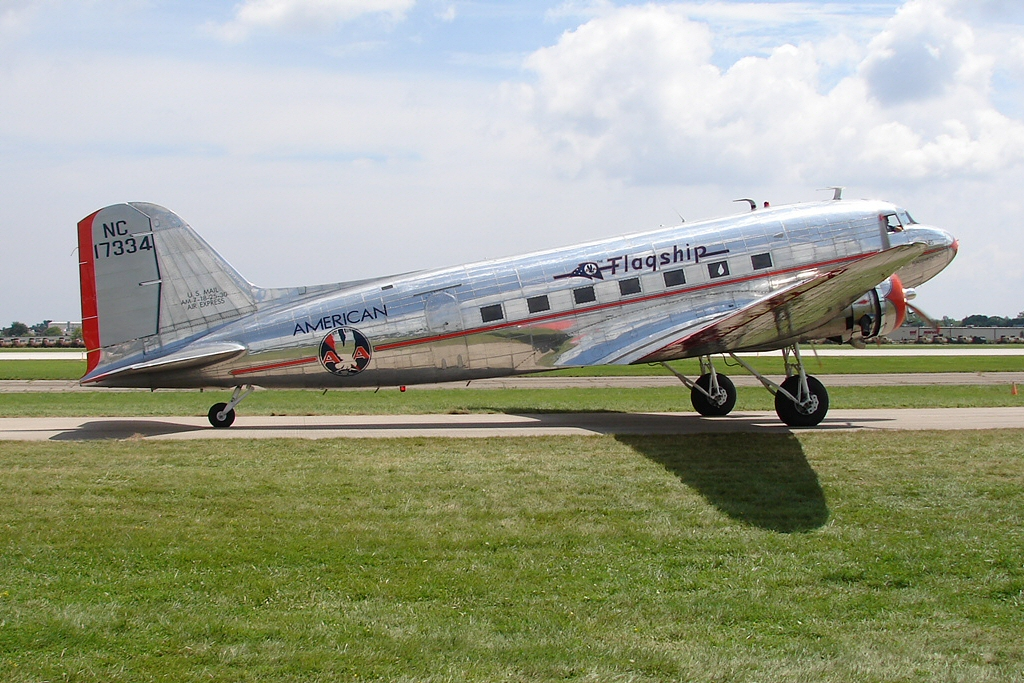
- An American Airlines DC-3, similar to the one lost in the mid-air collision
- Type: Douglas DC-3
- Name: Flagship Connecticut
- Operator: American Airlines
- Call sign: AMERICAN 28
- Registration: NC16017
- Flight origin: Lockheed Air Terminal, California, U.S.
- Stopover: Phoenix, Arizona, U.S.
- Destination: New York, New York, U.S.
- Occupants: 12
- Passengers: 9
- Crew: 3
- Fatalities: 12
- Survivors: 0

Second aircraft
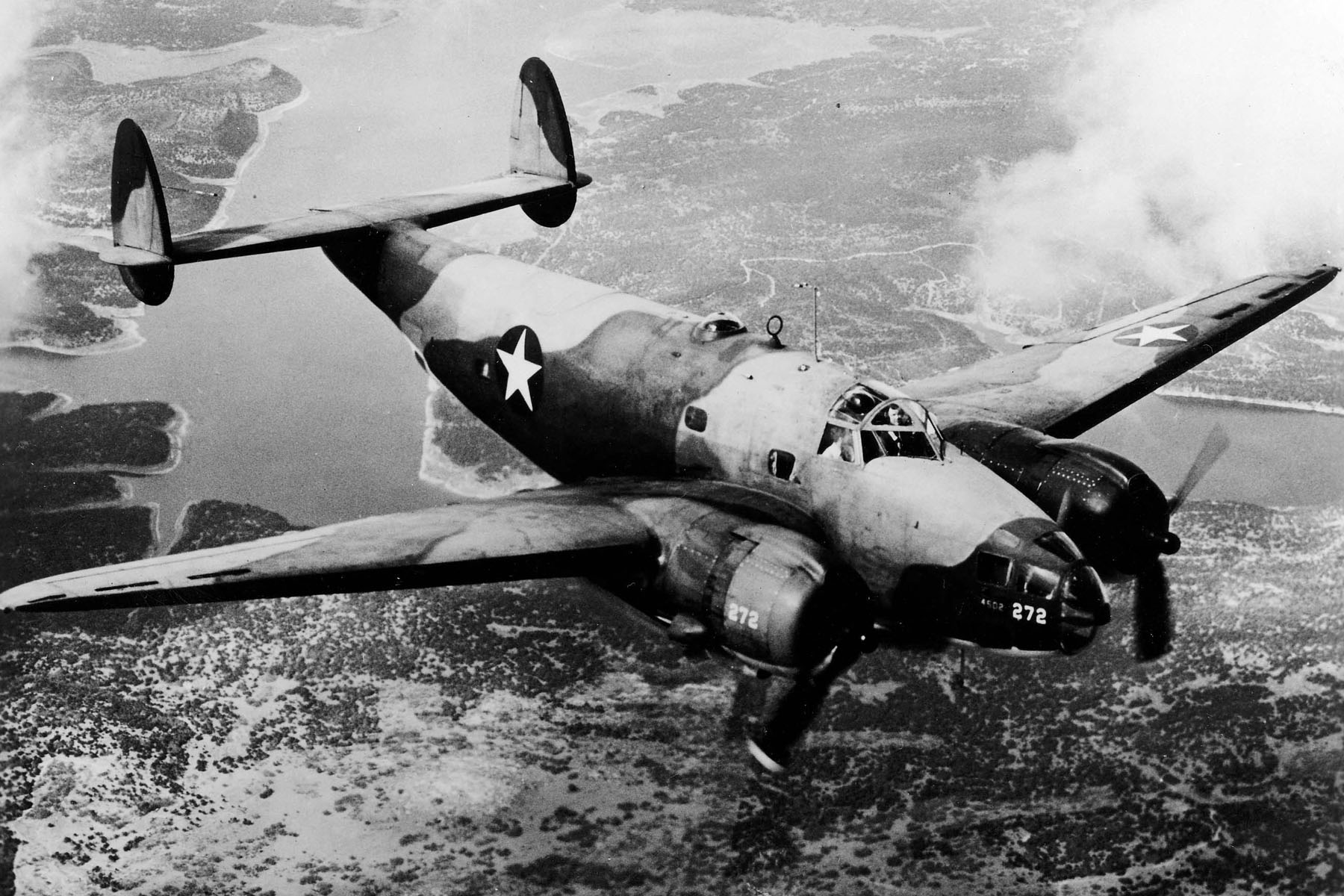
- A USAAF Lockheed B-34 'Lexington', similar to the one that collided with American Airlines Flight 28
- Type: Lockheed B-34 'Lexington' (Ventura IIA) bomber
- Operator: U.S. Army Air Forces
- Registration: 41–38116
- Flight origin: Long Beach Army Air Base, California, U.S.
- Destination: Palm Springs, California, U.S.
- Occupants: 2
- Crew: 2
- Fatalities: 0
- Survivors: 2

American Airlines Flight 28 was a scheduled domestic passenger flight operated by a Douglas DC-3 that crashed on October 23, 1942, in Chino Canyon near Palm Springs, California, United States, after being struck by a United States Army Air Forces Lockheed B-34 Lexington bomber. The B-34 suffered only minor damage, and landed safely at the Army Airport of the Sixth Ferrying Command, Palm Springs.

All nine passengers and three crewmembers on board the twin-engine DC-3 perished in the crash and subsequent fire; neither of the two Army pilots aboard the B-34 was injured. The army pilot was later tried on manslaughter charges, but was found not guilty by a court-martial trial board.

Casualties in the crash included Academy Award-winning Hollywood composer Ralph Rainger, who had written a number of hit songs including "I Wished on the Moon", "June in January", "Blue Hawaii", "Love in Bloom" (Jack Benny's signature song), and "Thanks for the Memory" (Bob Hope's signature song).

== Aircraft ==
American Airlines Flight 28 was served by a Douglas DC-3, registration NC16017, powered by two 1,102 horsepower (822 kW) Wright Cyclone engines and full-feathering propellers. It had been approved and certified by the Civil Aeronautics Board (CAB), and was rated to carry a maximum of twenty-one passengers and four crew. It was piloted by Captain Charles Fred Pedley, 42, who had flown for twelve years with American Airlines, and who had logged over 17,000 hours of flight time. The co-pilot was First Officer Louis Frederick Reppert, Jr., a 26-year-old pilot with 800 hours of flight time and six months' employment by the airline. The third crewmember was stewardess Estelle Frances Regan, age 27.

The Lockheed Ventura B-34 Lexington bomber, serial number 41-38116, was manufactured by the Lockheed Air Corporation and operated by the United States Army Air Forces. It was piloted by Lieutenant William Norman Wilson, 25, attached to the Air Transport Command and stationed at Long Beach, California. His copilot was Staff Sergeant Robert Reed Leicht, also 25, of the Sixth Ferrying Command, Army Air Forces, and also stationed at Long Beach.

== Flight and crash ==
Flight 28 departed from the Lockheed Air Terminal in Burbank, California, at 4:36 p.m. PDT (UTC−7) on October 23, 1942. At 5:02 p.m., Captain Pedley reported his position over Riverside and estimated his arrival over Indio at 5:22 p.m. and 9,000 feet (2,700 m). At 4:26 p.m., the B-34 bomber departed from Long Beach en route to Palm Springs. Lieutenant Wilson proceeded to Riverside, circled twice near March Field, and continued toward the San Gorgonio Pass.

At approximately 5:15 p.m., at an altitude of approximately 9,000 feet (2,700 m), Flight 28 was struck by the B-34. The DC-3 lost its rudder to the propeller from the B-34's right engine, along with portions of its tail. It fell from the sky in a flat spin and impacted a rocky ledge in Chino Canyon, below San Jacinto Peak, before crashing into the desert and exploding.

Lieutenant Wilson later testified at his court-martial proceedings that he first realized that the two aircraft had collided when he heard a "noise and a wrenching of my ship up... to my left." He also testified that he noticed that his aircraft handled sluggishly and the right engine felt "rough". He was informed by his copilot that they had hit the airliner. The B-34 called the Palm Springs tower to notify them of the accident and then subsequently landed at Army Airport in Palm Springs.

The Burbank operator at the company station reported that he had picked up a message from Flight 28 at exactly 5:15 p.m., saying: "Flight 28 from Burbank... correction Burbank from Flight 28..." The radio operator was only able to distinguish the flight calling Burbank, and though he attempted to respond he received no answer from Flight 28. He then directed the message to the American Airlines Flight Superintendent at Burbank. The CAB determined that, as Flight 28 crashed at 5:15 p.m., it was possible that the pilots were attempting to report the collision.

== Investigation ==
Three separate investigations into the accident occurred: a coroner's inquest, a military investigation and court martial, and the official congressional investigation of the CAB. Each of the three investigations was independent of the others.

The coroner's inquest was the first investigation to be completed, occurring shortly after the crash. Its purpose was not to decide absolute culpability, but rather to determine exactly the manner of death of the involved individuals. During the inquest, both surviving Army pilots testified that they had seen the airliner, but that they had subsequently lost sight of it when their aircraft flew into smoke from a nearby forest fire.

Airline officials and pilots had cause to say: 'I told you so.' Long & loud have been their complaints about Ferry Command pilots who hop on & off the airlines' beam without reporting positions to traffic controls.

— Time, November 2, 1942

CAB investigators arrived at the scene of the crash at midnight of October 23. The remnants of the aircraft were placed under military guard for the duration of the investigation. During the course of the investigation, it was learned that Lt. Wilson of the B-34 and First Officer Reppert of Flight 28 had trained together, and had met up the previous night and talked about their chances of meeting while in flight. Though they briefly discussed the possibility of signaling each other, they made no such plans to the effect. The B-34 copilot, Sergeant Leigh, told investigators that Wilson had confided that he'd like to fly close to the airliner and "thumb his nose at him." It was for this reason that the bomber circled twice around March Field in order to ensure that the aircraft would meet up during the flight to Palm Springs.

Subsequent depositions revealed that Lt. Wilson flew his B-34 level with the DC-3 and rocked his wings in greeting to First Officer Reppert. When Flight 28 did not respond in kind, the B-34 crossed over the airliner's line of flight and throttled back to allow the slower DC-3 to catch up. Wilson flew close to the airliner to attempt a second greeting but misjudged the distance between the aircraft, and when he tried to pull up, the B-34's right propeller sliced through the airliner's tail.

The CAB determined that the cause of the crash was:

The reckless and irresponsible conduct of Lieutenant William N. Wilson in deliberately maneuvering a bomber in dangerous proximity to an airliner in an unjustifiable attempt to attract the attention of the first officer (copilot) of the latter plane.

— Civil Aeronautics Board Docket #SA-74, File# 2362-42.

Lt. Wilson faced manslaughter charges by the United States Army. During the course of the court-martial proceedings, a number of military witnesses produced testimony that corroborated the findings of the CAB. However, one witness, Private Roy West, provided testimony in direct contradiction of the previous witnesses. According to Private West:

They were coming through this Pass and the Bomber in a right bank and the airliner moved in under it. The airliner nosed down and the tail came up and hit the right motor of the Bomber and the tail was cut off....

— Roy West, Private, US Army, Army Court Martial Proceedings of Lieutenant William Wilson.

The CAB dismissed West's statement as unreliable, as when a plane's nose dips, the tail does not rise by such a significant amount as witnessed by West. However, the court martial trial board acquitted Lt. Wilson of blame in the accident.

The B-34 that collided with American Flight 28 was repaired and re-designated as an RB-34A-4 target tug. On August 5, 1943, the same RB-34, serial number 41-38116, suffered engine failure during a ferry flight and crashed into Wolf Hill near Smithfield, Rhode Island, killing all three crew members.

== See also ==
- List of accidents and incidents involving airliners in the United States
- American Airlines accidents and incidents
- 1942 in aviation
