= North Shore Beach and Yacht Club =

Californian Historic Building

- North Shore Yacht Club
- U.S. National Register of Historic Places
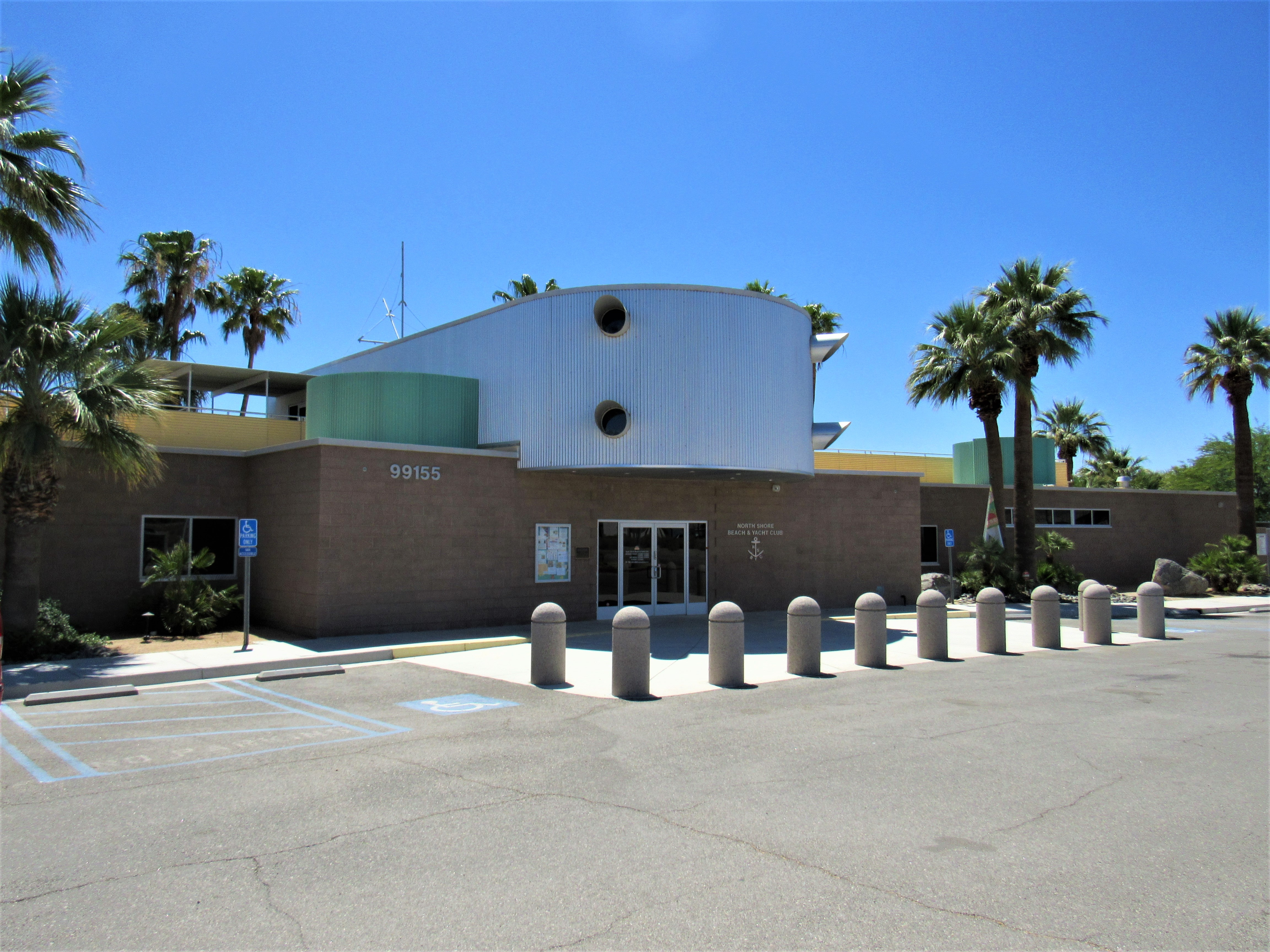
- North Shore Beach and Yacht Club in 2018

- Location within California Location within the United States
- Location: 99-155 Sea View Dr. Mecca, California
- Coordinates: 33°31′10″N 115°56′14″W
- Built: 1959–1962
- Architect: Albert Frey
- Architectural style: Modern Movement
- MPS: Architecture of Albert Frey MPS
- NRHP reference No.: 15000640
- Added to NRHP: September 28, 2015

The North Shore Beach and Yacht Club is an Albert Frey-designed building in North Shore, California. It opened in 1962 as part of a $2 million development along the northeastern shore of the Salton Sea, which would become California's largest marina.. Ever-increasing salinity from agricultural runoff from both the Coachella Valley and Imperial County combined with fluctuating water levels culminated in a major flood in 1981, destroying the club's jetty and making it impossible for boats to dock at the club; it would be completely closed by 1984. However, the club remained in use by the community into the early 1990s.

Like the majority of the buildings that surround it, the North Shore Beach and Yacht Club was abandoned and vandalized. In July 2009, Riverside County supervisors approved receiving a $3.35 million grant as part of an overall $30 million package to redevelop and restore the property.

== History ==
=== Golden Decade ===
Postcard depicting the North Shore Beach & Yacht Club during its heyday in the 1960s

In 1960, construction began on the North Shore Beach & Yacht Club and the North Shore Motel, designed by Albert Frey. Both opened in 1962, and North Shore's marina was one of the largest in Southern California.

For several years, North Shore was a popular place for celebrities like the Beach Boys, Jerry Lewis, Frank Sinatra, the Marx Brothers, Dean Martin, Bing Crosby, Desi Arnaz, Sony Bono, Rock Hudson, and others.

Developers Ray Ryan and Trav Rogers actively promoted the Salton Sea as "California's inland sea" and a desert paradise. Travel magazines, newspapers, and advertisements highlighted fishing tournaments, boating events, and celebrity appearances. This "glamorous getaway" image boosted visitor numbers far beyond what Yosemite National Park, could attract at the time. Annual visitors to the Salton Sea reached over 1.5 million, compared to Yosemite's roughly 1 million in the 1960s.

=== Decline ===
In 1968, California passed a statute (Assembly Bill 461) declaring that the primary use of the Salton Sea should be the collection of agricultural drainage, seepage, and other flow. Policy that had long-term environmental implications. Unfortunately, like other communities around the Salton Sea, North Shore Marina was plagued by fluctuating water levels, increasing salinity, and water contamination.

On September 7, 1976, Hurricane Kathleen left a destructive impact that stalled progress in the Eastern Coachella Valley. Eventually, the tourism business was depleted. Another devastating flood in 1981 destroyed the jetty, rendering the marina unusable, and in 1984, the yacht club closed.

In the early 2000s, the yacht club fell into disrepair. The shoreline retreated as evaporation and agricultural runoff continued to increase the Salton Sea's toxicity.

In 2007, Rock Group Linkin Park photographed the abandoned North Shore Beach & Yacht Club as the backdrop to their album cover for Minutes to Midnight. The team came from Los Angeles on a Charter bus and photographed and posed outside the building, notably on the Salton Sea's shore, and the yacht club's dried-out swimming pool.

In November 2008, the North Shore Motel at the Salton Sea was demolished.

=== Redevelopment ===
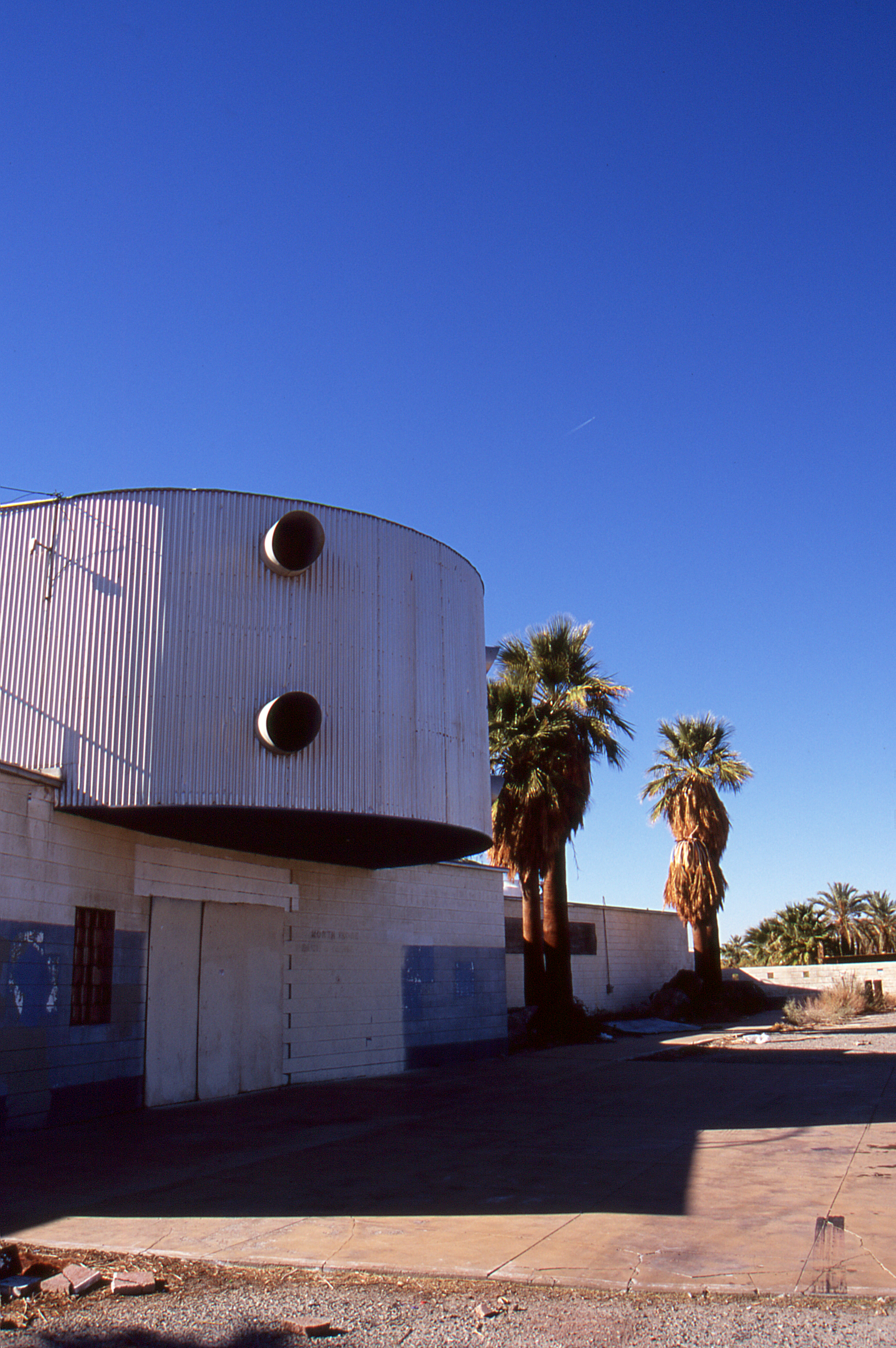
After closing in 1984 and abandoned in the 1990s, North Shore Beach & Yacht Club became a cultural landmark and gathering spot for young locals and tourists.

In July 2009, the County of Riverside secured over $3.35 million in funding to restore the deteriorating yacht club. Despite locals opposing, On May 1, 2010, it opened its doors to the public as the Salton Sea History Museum and Community Center.

On June 3, 2011, the Salton Sea History Museum vacated due to leasing and funding issues. The museum relocated to Mecca. The community center remained open for community meetings and events.

In 2015, the yacht club was listed on the National Register of Historic Places.

In 2017, the Salton Sea's shoreline began retreating more quickly, exposing additional lake bed around the North Shore Marina.

On October 19, 2023, the North Lake Pilot Demonstration Project, a developmental initiative aimed at revitalizing recreation and tourism in the town, was presented by Congressman Eduardo Garcia. It was planned as a habitat and dust-control project, designed to re-flood or cover exposed lake bed with water, wetlands, or vegetation to keep dust down. Construction is expected to commence in 2026.

== In popular culture ==
Several prominent figures from the entertainment industry docked boats there, among them members of the Beach Boys, Guy Lombardo, Jerry Lewis and the Marx Brothers.

North Shore Beach & Yacht Club is pictured on the alternative album covers of Linkin Park's 2007 album Minutes to Midnight.

The North Shore Beach & Yacht Club is featured in the 2013 video game Grand Theft Auto V. In the game, the building is named The Boat House and is located in Sandy Shores on the Alamo Sea, which is the fictional name for the town of North Shore, and the Salton Sea.
