= Cork =

"Cork" or "CORK" may refer to:

== Materials ==
- Cork (material), an impermeable buoyant plant product
  - Stopper (plug), or "cork", a cylindrical or conical object used to seal a container
    - Wine cork to seal or reseal wine

== Places ==
=== Ireland ===
- Cork (city)
  - Metropolitan Cork, also known as Greater Cork
  - Cork Airport
- County Cork

==== Historic constituencies ====
===== Westminster =====
- Cork City (Parliament of Ireland constituency)
- County Cork (Parliament of Ireland constituency)
- Cork City (UK Parliament constituency)
- County Cork (UK Parliament constituency)

===== Dáil Éireann =====
- Cork Borough (Dáil constituency)
- Cork City (Dáil constituency)
- Cork City North-West
- Cork City South-East

=== United States ===
- Cork, Georgia
- Cork, Kentucky

== Organisations ==
- Cork GAA, responsible for Gaelic games in County Cork
- Ye Antient Order of Noble Corks, a masonic order, also known as "The Cork"
- Cork City F.C., a football club
- Cork City W.F.C., a women's football club

== Other uses ==
- A particular kind of trick in snowboarding and skiing.
- Cork (surname)
- Cork City (barony)
- Cork encoding, a digital data format
- Cork taint, a wine fault
- Canadian Olympic-training Regatta, Kingston, a sailing regatta
- Cork (band), a 1990s rock duo/supergroup
- Cork (film), a Spanish drama
- SS Cork
- SS City of Cork
- CORK, Circulation Obviation Retrofit Kits

== See also ==
- Cork County Council
- Cork Harbour
- Roman Catholic Diocese of Cork and Ross
- Cork tree (disambiguation)
- Cork oak, Quercus suber tree, the main source of cork
- Cork cambium, a tissue found in many vascular plants as part of the epidermis
- Corke, a surname
- Corky (disambiguation)
- Kork (disambiguation)
- KORK (disambiguation)
