= Jack Laxer =

American photographer (1927–2018)

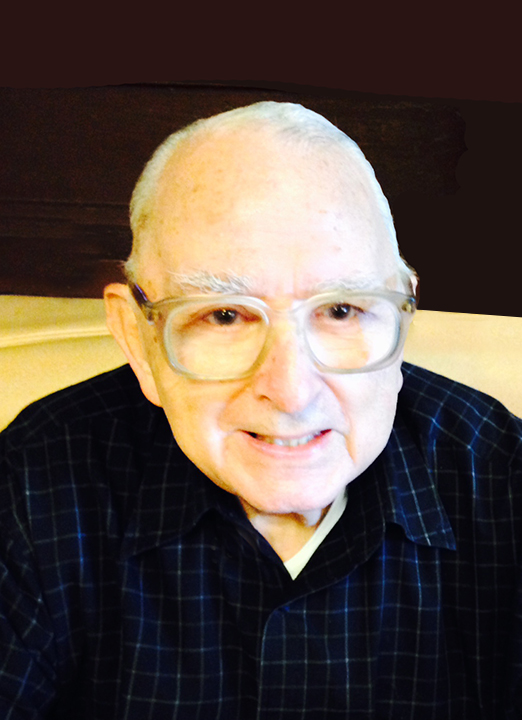
Portrait of photographer Jack Laxer taken in Los Angeles, California, on February 14, 2014.

Jack Laxer (1927–2018) was an American photographer, known for his work in stereoscopy.

His photographs of California modern architecture have been published in magazines and books, displayed in museums, and included in educational programs since the 1950s.

== Career ==
He photographed the homes of Lucille Ball and Harold Lloyd with the Stereo Realist camera. His clients included the architects Paul Revere Williams, William F. Cody, Arthur Froehlich, Ladd & Kelsey, and Armet & Davis, best known for their Googie architecture coffee shops.

Beginning in 1951, he documented the designs of Louis Armet and Eldon Davis including Norms, Pann's coffee shop restaurant, and the Holiday Bowl bowling alley. These images were included in Alan Hess's book Googie: Fifties Coffee Shop Architecture, setting off a revival of interest in the style beginning in the 1980s.

The Los Angeles Conservancy Modern Committee exhibited Laxer's photography in 1993 in an exhibition about the work of Armet & Davis at the Union Oil Center. In 2001, the group projected them in 3-D at the California Science Center.

In 2009, DKRM Gallery in Los Angeles exhibited his work in the solo show Ultra-Angeles: Kodachrome in 3-D.

Laxer taught a course at the J. Paul Getty Museum in 2010 called Modernism in 3-D: The Art of Stereo Photography.

The Chinese American Museum exhibited his 3D work in specially built viewers as part of its 2012 exhibit Breaking Ground: Chinese American Architects in Los Angeles.

The J. Paul Getty Museum included Laxer's work (the only stereo photos) in the exhibit and publication Overdrive: L.A. Constructs The Future, which ran as part of the museum's Pacific Standard Time series before relocating to the National Building Museum in Washington, D.C., in October 2013.

=== Award ===
The Los Angeles Conservancy presented Laxer with the Modern Master award in 2009.

== Death ==
He died on June 12, 2018, at the age of 91.

== See also ==
- List of American artists
- List of people from California
- List of photographers
