= Helen Liu Fong =

American architect

- Helen Liu Fong, photographed by Larry Hirshowitz (published in Los Angeles magazine, December 2000)
- Born: January 14, 1927; Los Angeles, California, U.S.
- Died: 17 April 2005 (aged 78); Glendora, California, U.S.
- Occupations: Architect, Interior Designer

Helen Liu Fong (January 14, 1927–April 17, 2005) was an American architect and interior designer from Los Angeles, California. Fong was an important figure in the Googie architecture movement, designing futuristic buildings like Norms Restaurant, the Holiday Bowl, Denny's, Bob's Big Boy, Corky's and Pann's Coffee Shop that helped usher in an era of boomerang angles, dynamic forms and neon lights. Fong worked with Armet and Davis on many of her most well-known projects. Many of Fong's best-known building designs feature large glass fronts and bold colors on interior walls, designed to stand out and entice potential customers.

== Background and education ==
Fong was born in Chinatown, Los Angeles to Chinese immigrant parents, one of five children. Fong grew up working in her family's laundry business, and knew by age 12 that she wanted to become an architect. She began attending University of California, Los Angeles in 1943, transferring to University of California, Berkeley after two years. Fong graduated with a degree in city planning from the University of California, Berkeley in 1949.

== Career ==
Fong joined the architecture firm of Eugene Kinn Choy in 1949 and worked there for two years before downsizing landed her at the firm of Louis Armet and Eldon Davis. One of her first projects with the firm was their first Googie-style building, The Clock Restaurant in Westchester, where Fong recommended the use of bright, strong wall colors that would be easily visible from the roadside. The firm quickly became known for their exciting Googie designs, and Fong worked on hundreds of buildings, including hotels, gas stations, restaurants and coffee shops.

The mid 1950s saw Fong working on two of her firm's most well-known designs, Norms Restaurant and the Holiday Bowl. The Norms designed by Armet and Davis in 1955 was not their first location, but the building's iconic pennant-based sign and semi-open kitchen design became hallmarks of the company's image. Fong's interior design aimed to make the restaurant more efficient for guests and employees, as well as creating spectacle that would lure in new customers.

The Holiday Bowl, built in 1958 in the Crenshaw neighborhood, became one of Fong's most celebrated projects. She led the design of the cocktail lounge, putting in touches like a 3-D map of Japan, to pay tribute to the Japanese American community, just rebuilding after World War II internment. The Holiday Bowl stood as a landmark and community center in Crenshaw for over four decades, bringing together Japanese Americans, African Americans, and Chinese Americans, among others.

Fong's work was rewarded with a promotion to associate at Armet & Davis in 1964, charging her with handling client relationships and managing projects in addition to her design work. Fong retired from the design firm in the late 1970s.

== Legacy ==
In 2012, the Chinese American Museum featured a group exhibition with works from four Chinese-American architects who were based in Southern California: Fong, Eugene K. Choy, Gilbert Leong, and Gin D. Wong.

Designs of Helen Liu Fong
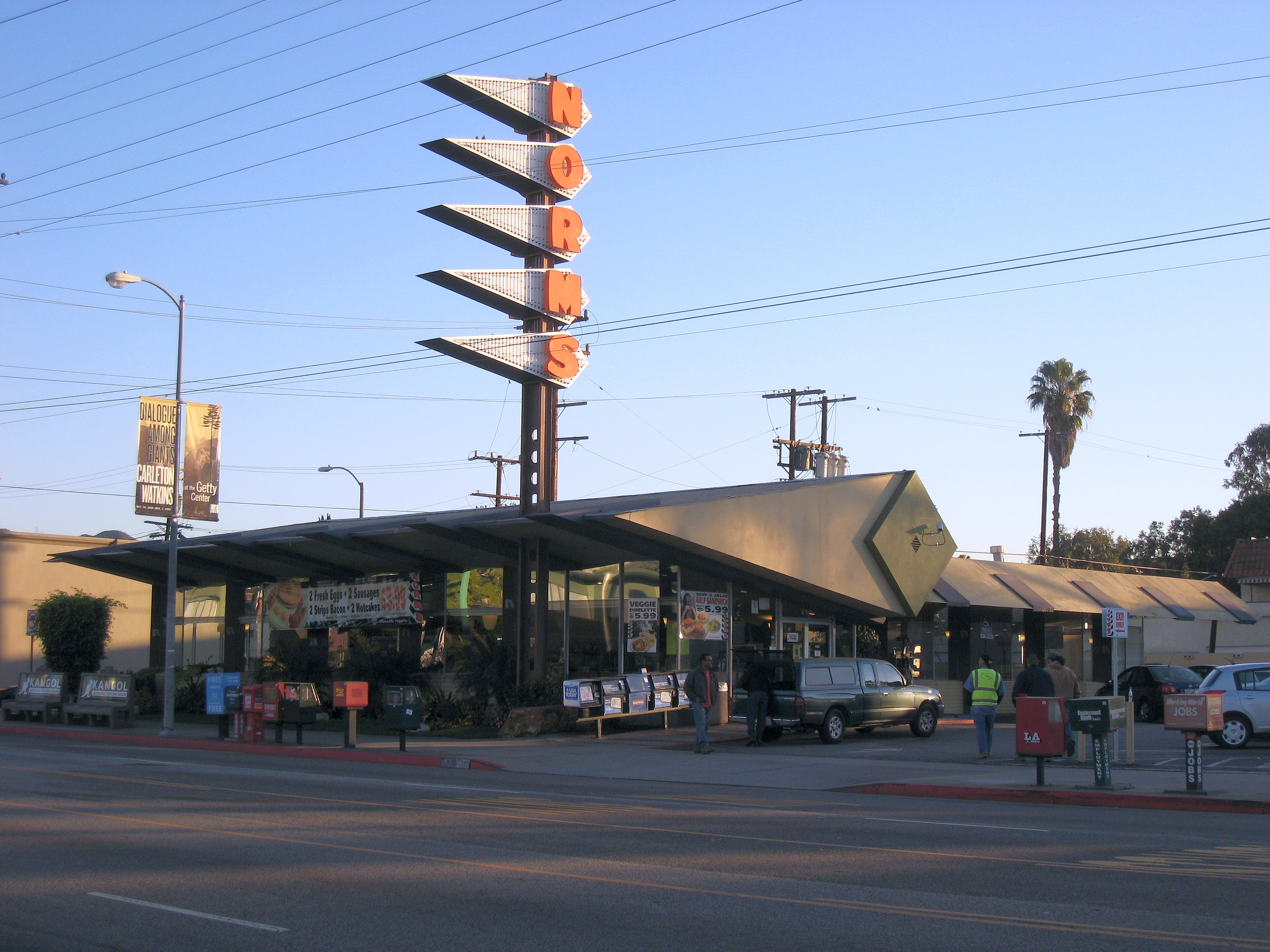
Norms restaurant

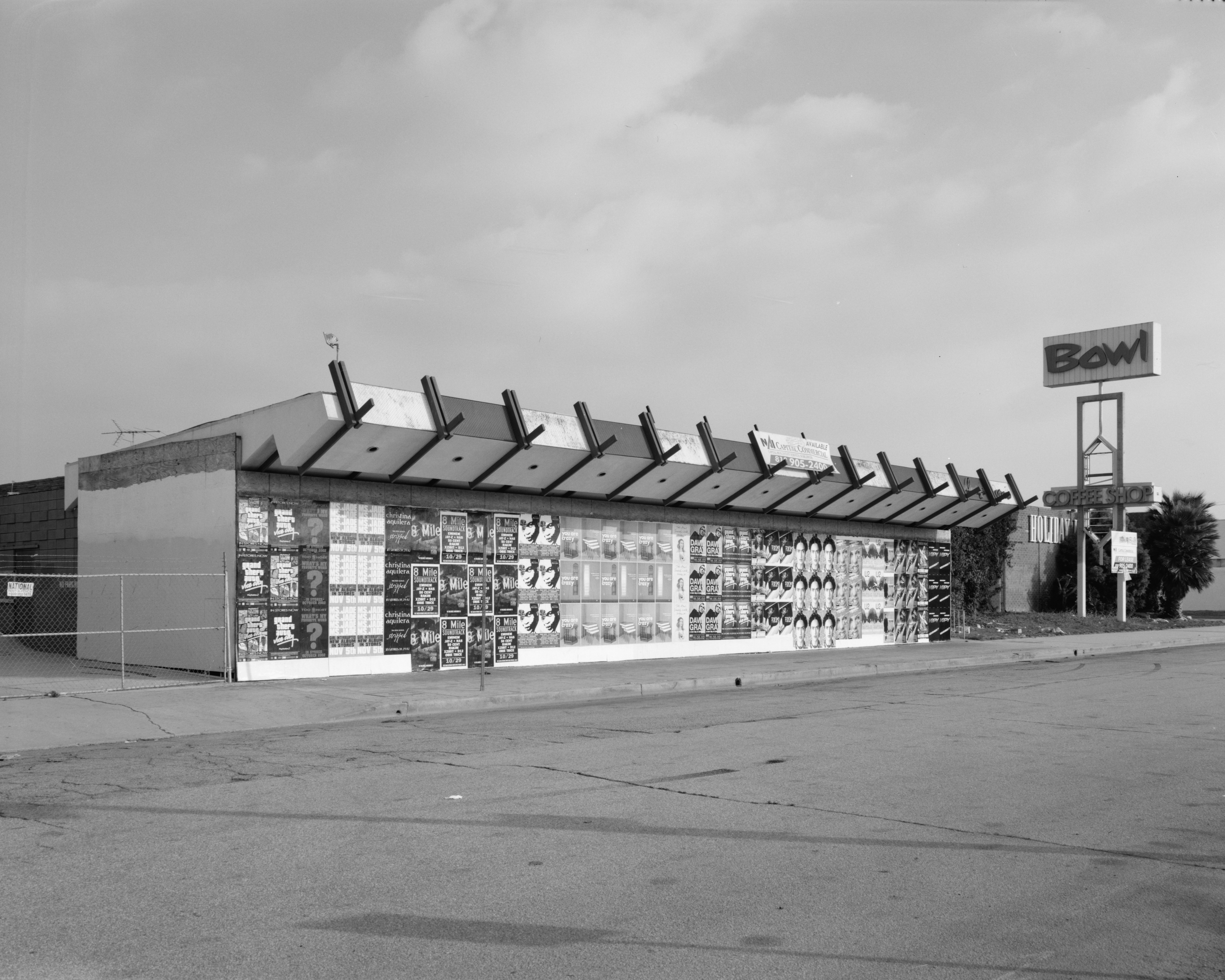
Holiday Bowl

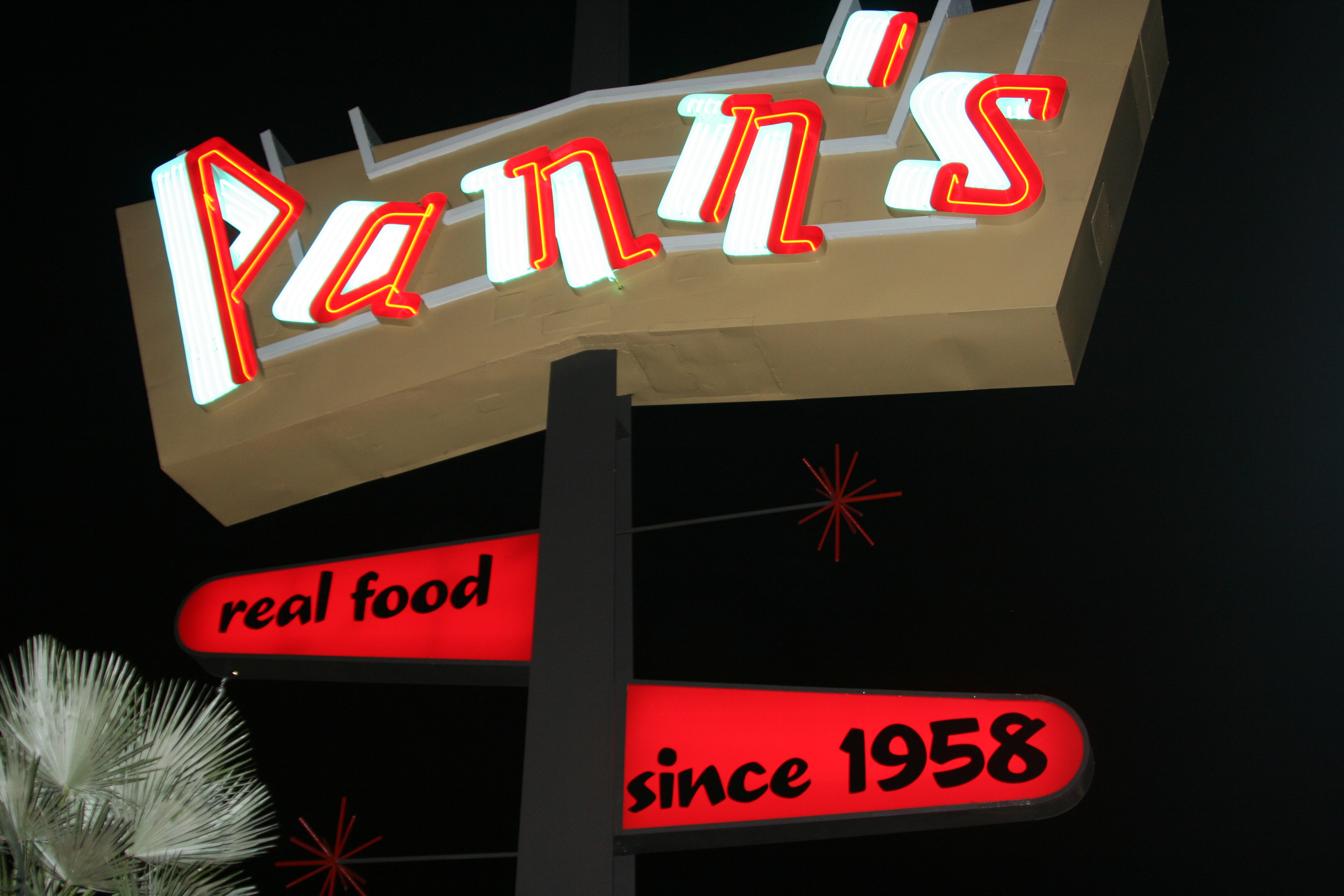
Pann's coffee shop signs

== See also ==
- History of the Chinese Americans in Los Angeles
- List of California women architects
