= Johnie's Coffee Shop =

Los Angeles Historic-Cultural Monument

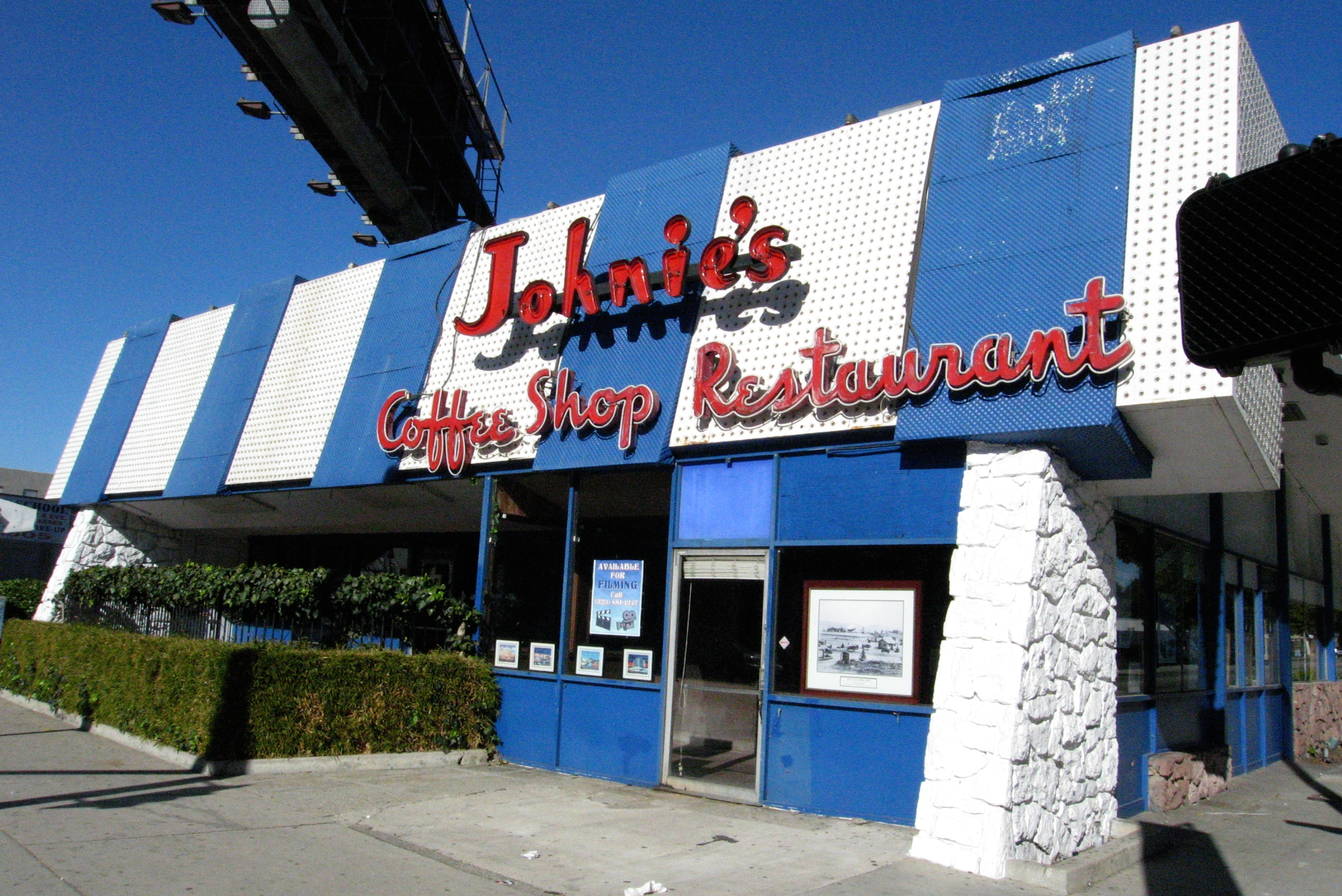
- Johnie's Coffee Shop, 2007.
- Interactive map of Johnie's Coffee Shop
- Location: 6101 Wilshire Boulevard; Los Angeles, California, United States
- Coordinates: 34.063288°N 118.361603°W
- Built: 1956
- Architect: Armét & Davis
- Architectural style: Googie Style

Los Angeles Historic-Cultural Monument
- Official name: Johnie's Coffee Shop Restaurant
- Designated: November 27, 2013
- Reference no.: 1045

Johnie's Coffee Shop is a former coffee shop and a well-known example of Googie architecture located on the corner of Wilshire Boulevard and Fairfax Avenue in Los Angeles, California. Architects Louis Armét and Eldon Davis of Armét & Davis designed the building, contributing to their reputation as the premier designers of Space Age or Googie coffee shops—including the landmark Pann's coffee shop in Ladera Heights, Norms Restaurant on La Cienega Boulevard, and several Bob's Big Boy restaurants.

== History ==
Johnie's opened in 1956 as Romeo's Times Square. Romeo's was in business a few years, becoming Ram's in the early 1960s and Johnie's shortly thereafter.

"Johnie's" is spelled in massive neon lights and flashing incandescent lightbulbs on the building's striped roof. The roof sits on the rock columns, sloping down toward the back of the restaurant, ending in a sharp decline that gives the illusion of movement like a spaceship ready to take off. Alan Hess, author of two books on Googie architecture, said, "Johnie's, and the style it represents, tells us as much about that period in L.A. history as the bungalows of Pasadena told us about the 1900s or the missions told us about 19th-century Southern California." He also noted that "the building embodies all of the changes in L.A.: becoming suburban, auto-oriented, also becoming a city of the future."

The restaurant was purchased in 1994 by the Gold family, founders of the 99 Cents Only Stores, and closed in 2000. The family leases Johnie's parking lot to the Wilshire Boulevard 99 Cents Only outlet two doors away.

The restaurant is perhaps best known as the setting for much of the first act of the 1988 cult film Miracle Mile, in which a patron learns that a nuclear war is about to begin. The restaurant also appeared in a 1999 Tom Petty and the Heartbreakers music video, "Swingin';" In A 2000 SHeDAISY music video, "Lucky 4 You (Tonight I'm Just Me);" in a 2003 Reba McEntire music video, "Somebody;" and extensively in Sean Kingston's music video "Beautiful Girls."

The restaurant is seen in several movies, including Volcano, starring Tommy Lee Jones; The Big Lebowski, starring Jeff Bridges and John Goodman; and American History X, starring Edward Norton. Johnie's was also featured in the 1998 film City of Angels and the 2000 film Gone in 60 Seconds, both starring Nicolas Cage. Some scenes from the award-winning short film Make Hay When the Sun Shines took place in the historic restaurant.

Johnie's is located across from the May Co. department store, one of Los Angeles' best examples of Streamline Moderne architecture, on the Miracle Mile. The May Co. building is now part of the Academy Museum of Motion Pictures.

Johnie's was declared a historical landmark by the Los Angeles City Council on November 27, 2013.

On May 5, 2016, the coffee shop was temporarily renamed "Bernie's Coffee Shop" in honor of presidential candidate Bernie Sanders. The shop retained that name and served as a campaign office until at least June 7, 2016.

On May 8, 2026, artist Gary Baseman opened a solo exhibition at Johnie's titled Off the Menu.

== Photo gallery ==
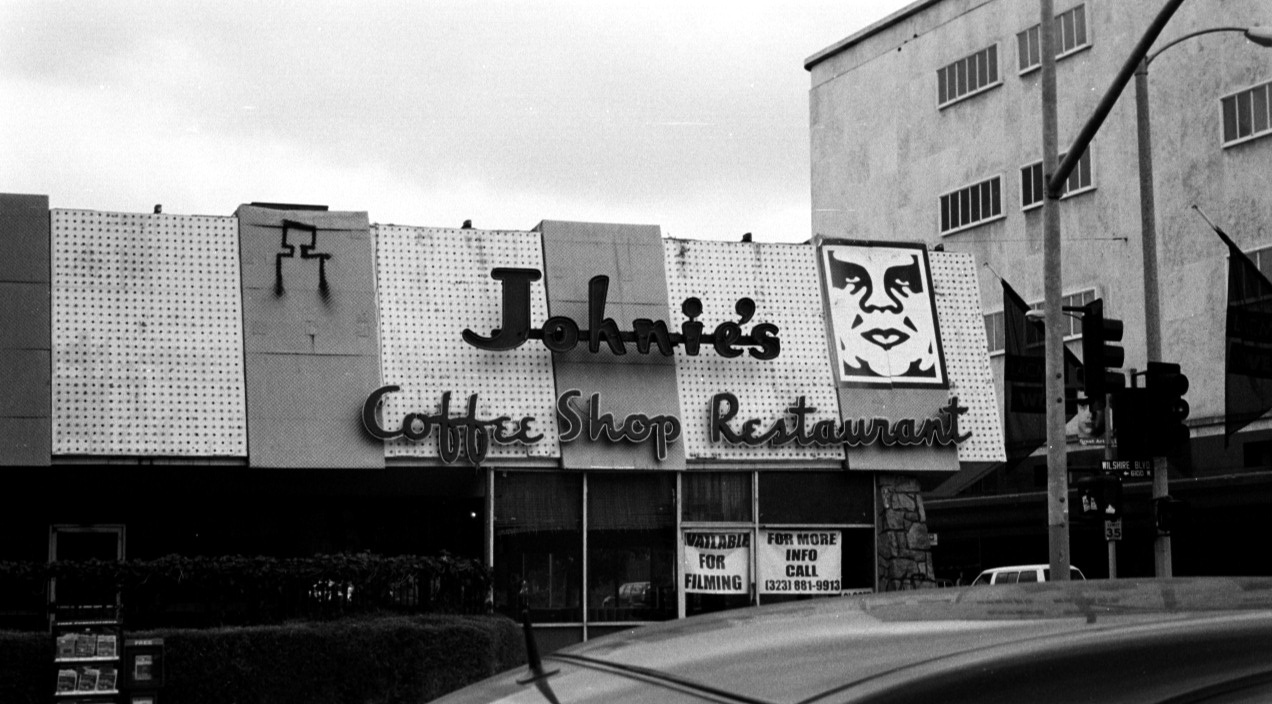
Johnie's Coffee Shop Restaurant, 2006

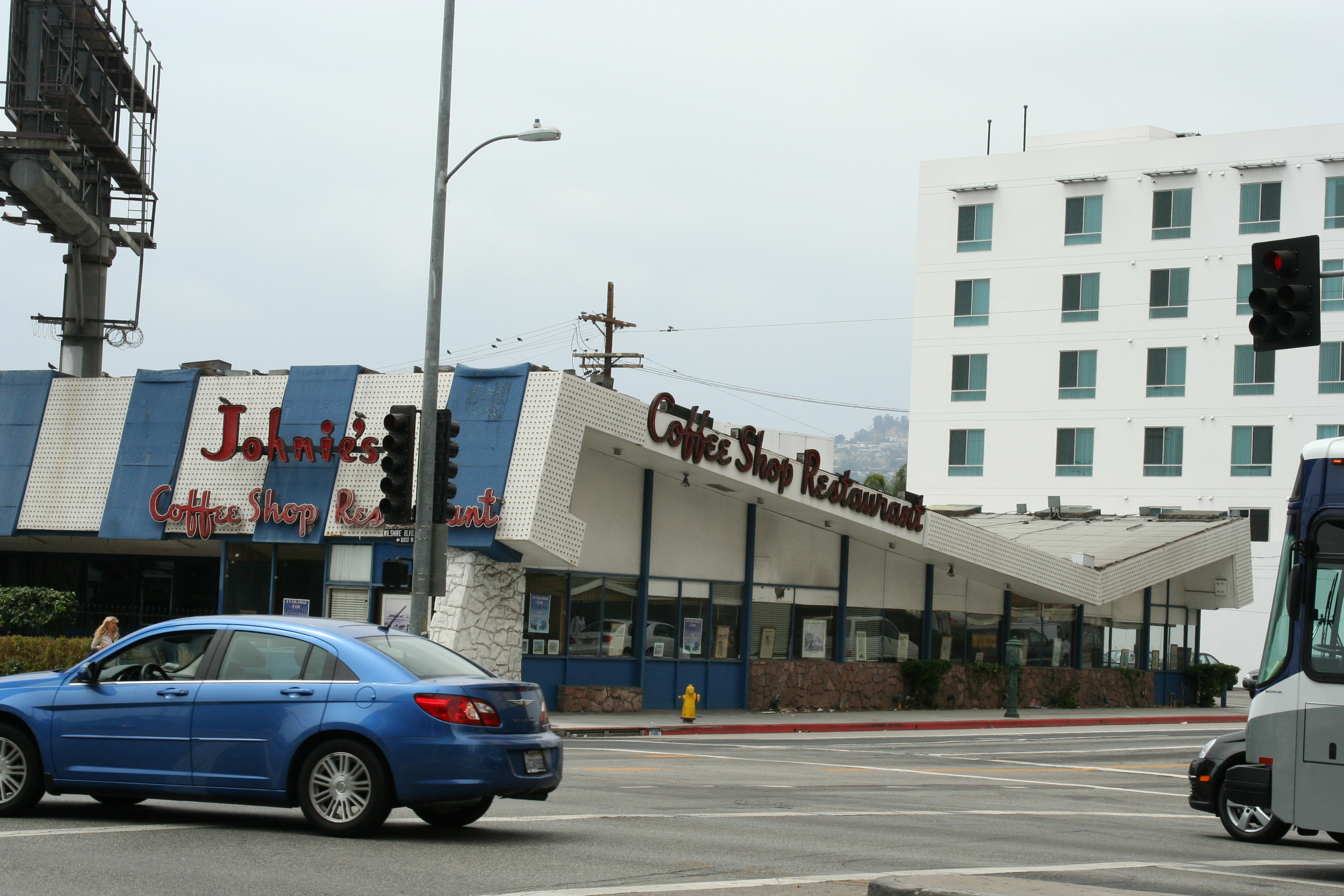
Southeastern corner of Johnie's Coffee Shop from Wilshire Boulevard, 2009

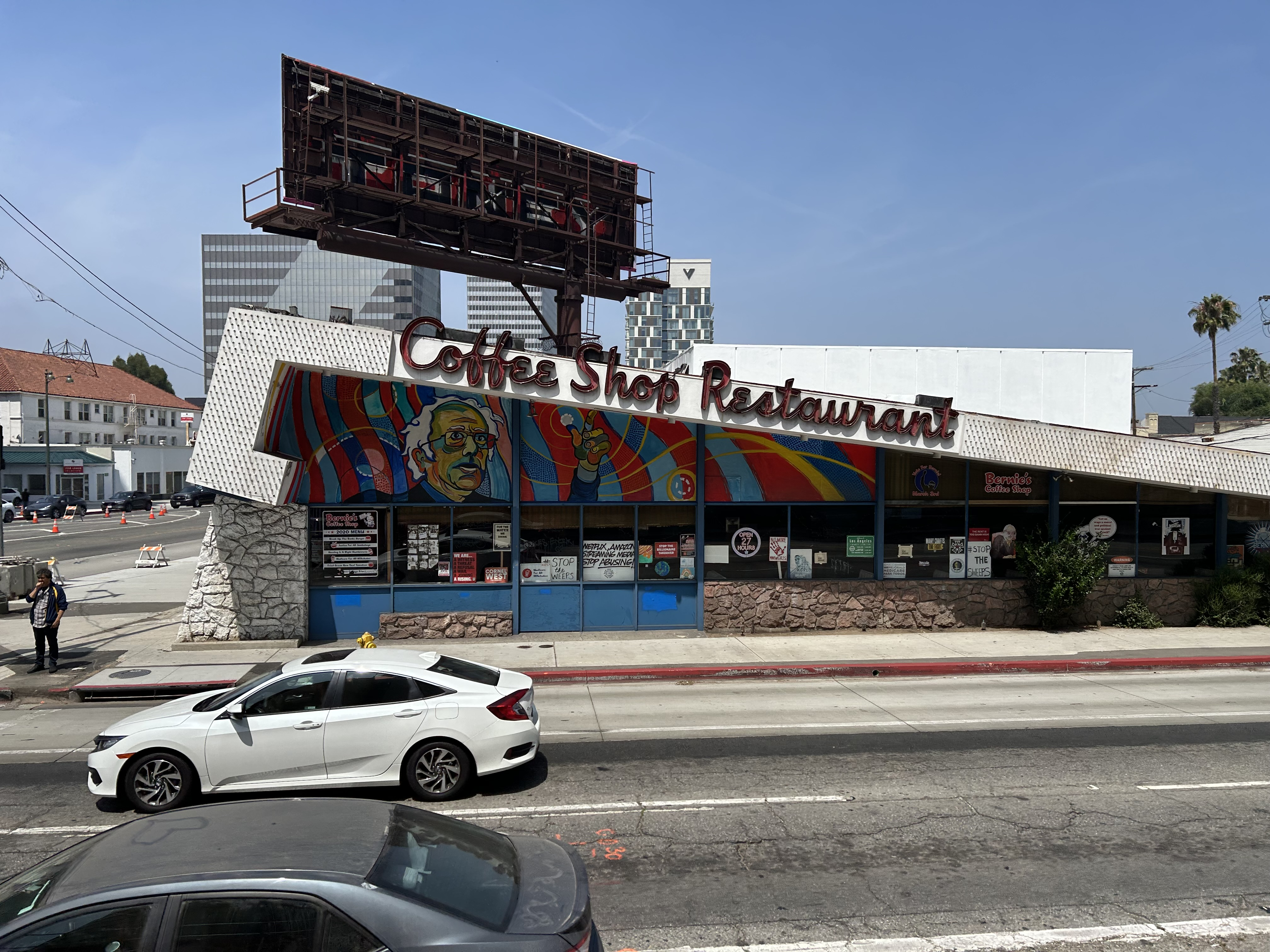
Bernie’s Coffee Shop, 2025

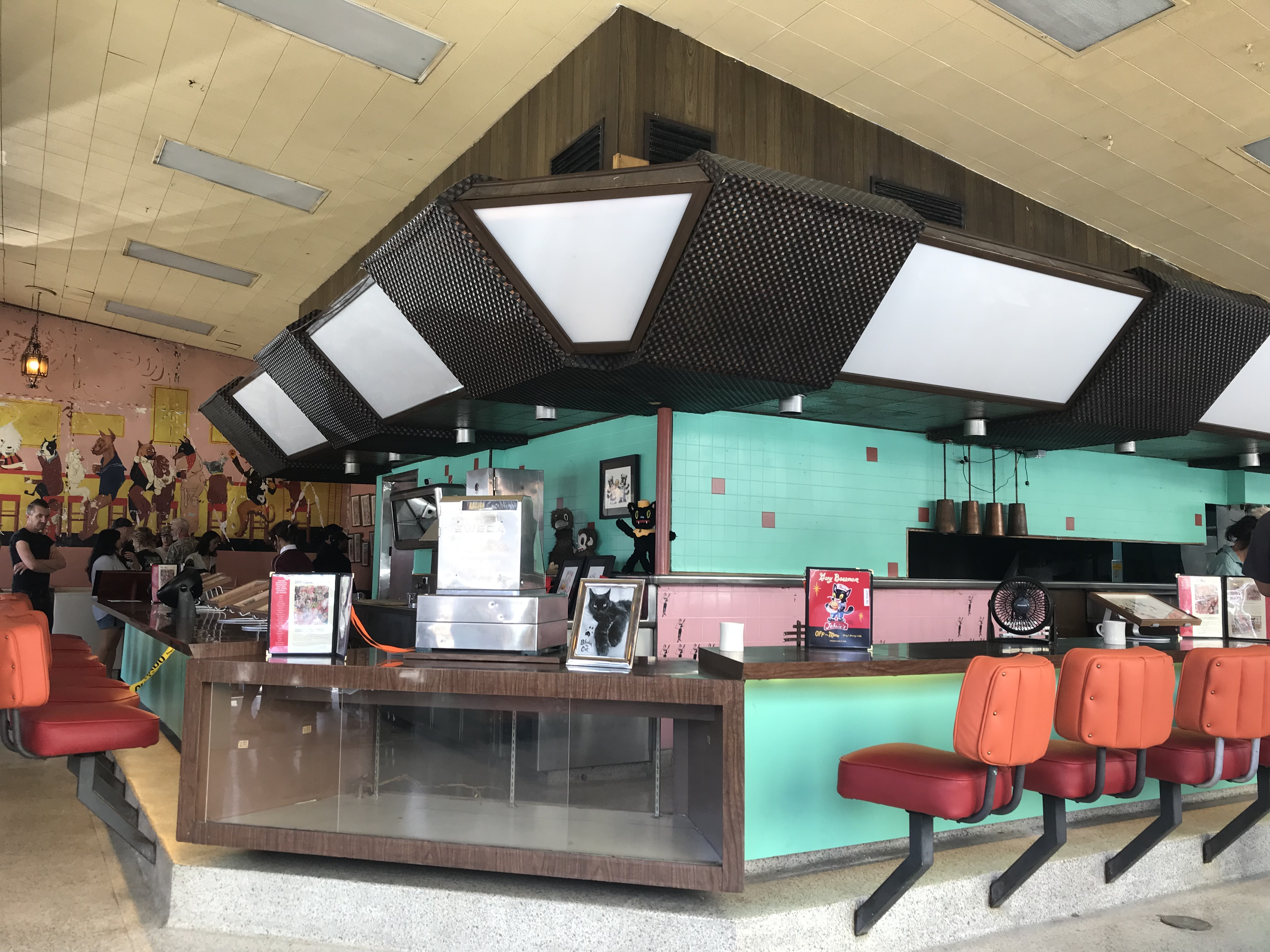
Interior of Johnie's, May 2026

== See also ==
- The Quality Cafe, another cafe that is featured in a number of movies and TV shows.
- Johnie's Broiler
