= Johnie's Broiler =

American restaurant in Downey, California

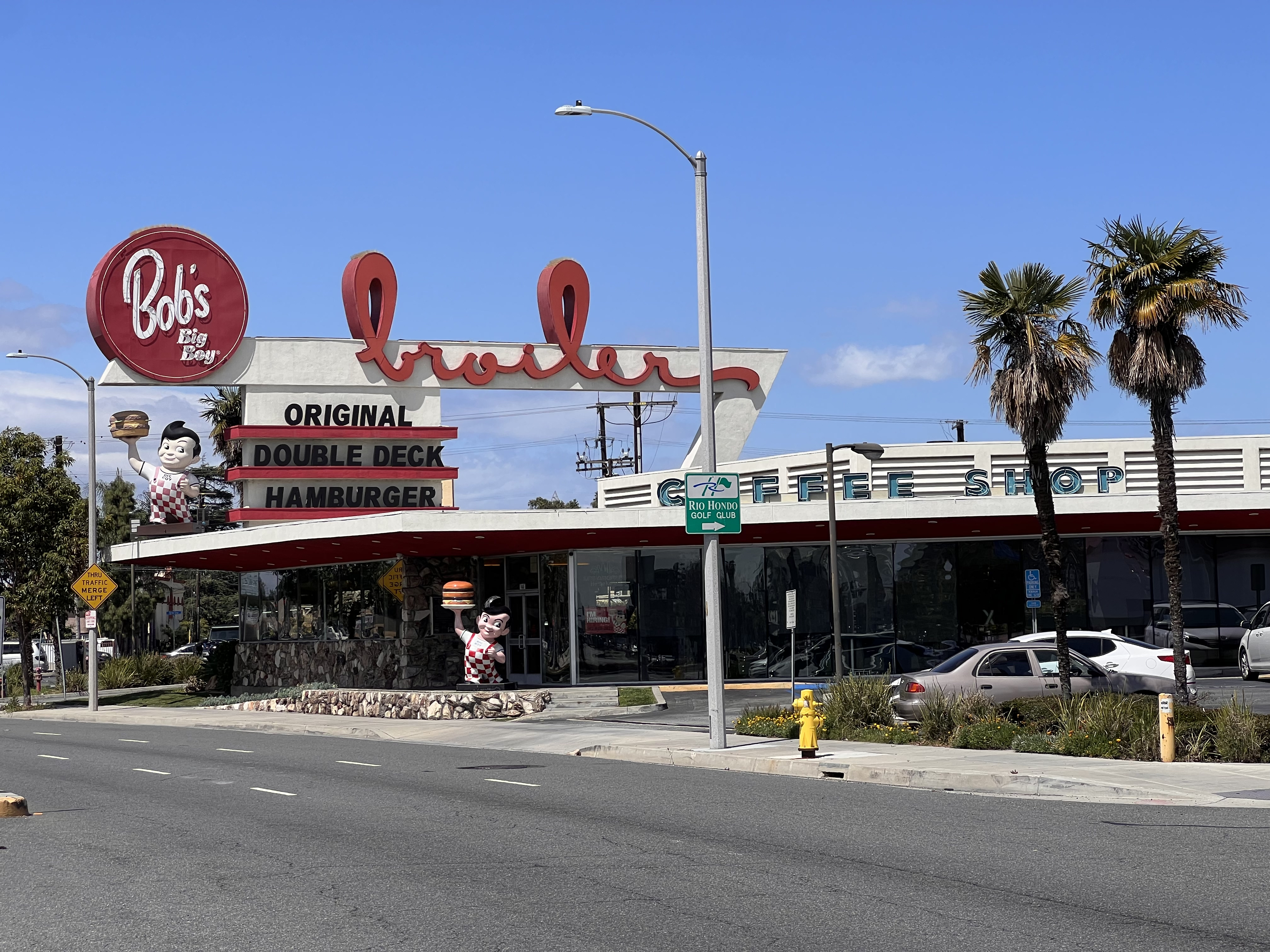
- Exterior of Johnie's Broiler, operating as Bob's Big Boy Broiler, in 2023
- Interactive map of the Johnie's Broiler area
- Former names: Harvey's Broiler (1958–1968)
- Alternative names: Bob's Big Boy Broiler (2009–present)

General information
- Type: Restaurant
- Architectural style: Googie
- Coordinates: 33.9477°N 118.1472°W
- Current tenants: Bob's Big Boy Broiler
- Completed: 1958
- Renovated: 2009 (reconstruction after illegal demolition)
- Demolished: 2007 (illegally)
- Landlord: Christos Smyrniotis

Technical details
- Floor area: 75,000 sq ft (7,000 m^{2})

Design and construction
- Architect: Paul B. Clayton
- Interactive map of Johnie's Broiler

Restaurant information
- Established: 1958; 68 years ago as Harvey's Broiler; October 19, 2009; 16 years ago as Bob's Big Boy Broiler
- Owner: Jim Louder
- Food type: Diner, double-decker cheeseburger
- Location: 7447 Firestone Boulevard, Downey, California, 90241
- Seating capacity: 185
- Website: bobsbigboybroiler.com

Johnie's Broiler, originally known as Harvey's Broiler and currently operating as Bob's Big Boy Broiler, is a restaurant located in Downey, California. It first opened in 1958 by Harvey Ortner, a former partner in the Clock Broiler restaurants chain in the Los Angeles area. Due to its 1950s Googie style, the restaurant became featured in several films and TV shows. The restaurant was then renamed Johnie's Broiler in 1968 before closing in 2001. From 2002 to 2006, the building and parking lot housed a used car dealership. The building was largely demolished illegally in January 2007 by its then-lease-holder without obtaining the proper permits. The restaurant was reconstructed in 2009 with the help of preservationists and other supporters and re-opened as part of the Bob's Big Boy chain while retaining the original building's look and design.

== History ==
=== Harvey's Broiler ===
The restaurant was founded as Harvey's Broiler, named after owner Harvey Ortner, a former partner in the Clock Broiler restaurants of Alhambra, Lynwood, Bellflower, Culver City, Van Nuys, South Pasadena and Temple City. Ortner and his wife Minnie purchased former poultry farm property located on Firestone Boulevard and Old River School Road in 1950. The couple hired architect Paul B. Clayton to design the Harvey's Broiler which was completed in 1958. Clayton's design incorporates Southern California Googie architectural elements intended to attract customers from motorists traveling in either direction on Firestone Boulevard.

While writing about the Southern California culture, writer Tom Wolfe wrote in the early 1960s that "They cruise around in their cars in Harvey’s huge parking lot, boys and girls, showing each other the latest in fashions, in cars, hairdos (male and female) and clothes in the Los Angeles Teenage... and Second-Generation Teenage... modes, Teenage Paris! Harvey’s Drive-in!".

Harvey's was featured in the 1961 issue of Sports Illustrated, where it was described this way:

A favorite in the Los Angeles area is Harvey's Broiler, a drive-in in the suburb of Downey. Here high school hot rodders gather to partake of the glorified "chubby," a double hamburger, gape at one another's cars and check on the latest fads. On weekend nights hundreds of cars jam the parking lot, and eager drivers waiting for a berth circle the block. Occasionally an impatient driver races his engine twice in rapid succession, sending a throaty whoom-whoom into the soft night air. Instantly other drivers respond in automatic litany. In the old days this ritual, called "rapping the engine," was a challenge to a street race.

Harvey's Broiler was an overnight success and thousands of people came from all over the United States to experience the phenomenon of "The Broiler".

=== Johnie's Broiler ===
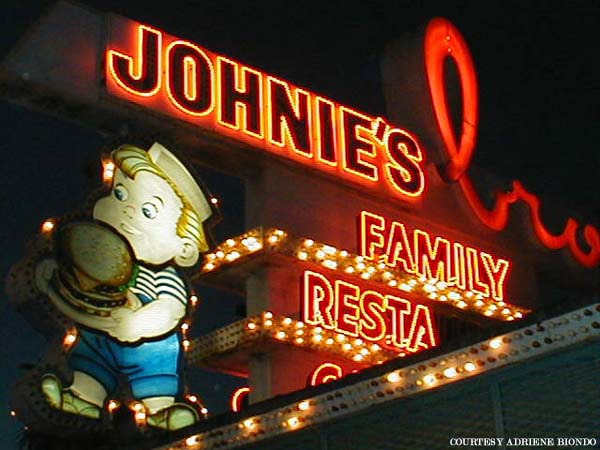
Original signage of Johnie's Broiler, taken in 2002

The restaurant was renamed Johnie's Broiler in 1968 and additional signage was installed in 1969 after the sale of the restaurant to an interim owner by the name of Johnson (hence the reason for the single "n" in "Johnie's"). Apparently this interim owner could not meet the terms of the agreement and the sign had already been changed from Harvey's to Johnie's. Drive-In curb service ceased in 1970.

Ortner executed a lease-to-own agreement with Christos Smyrniotis in 1970. The future owner had been employed as an assistant chef at the Broiler.

Johnie's Broiler was a Harvey Ortner Enterprise listed on his business card as late as 1983 and according to an interview done by Burly Burlile in June of that year.

The "Fat Boy" mascot, modeled after Beanie from the cartoon show Beany and Cecil (not the Bob's Big Boy character), animated incandescent yellow bulbs on the roof edges and the "OPEN 24 HOURS" lettering, were added in 1969 and Downey's Broiler became a sister store to Johnie's Coffee Shop Wilshire (originally a Simon's Drive-In site and currently employing its former 1955 Romeo's Times Square construction – an Armet & Davis design). This location appears to have been owned by the Johnsons who could not satisfy their agreement for the Downey location with the Ortners.

=== Closure and illegal demolition ===
On New Year's Eve 2001, Johnie's Broiler ended operation and early in 2002 new tenants gutted part of the interior and converted the restaurant and parking area into a used car dealership.

A local grassroots campaign to preserve the drive-in's exterior ensued, led by Adriene Biondo, John Eng and Alan Leib of the Los Angeles Conservancy's Modern Committee, and Analisa Ridenour-Hungerford of the Friends of Johnie's advocacy group. In early 2002, the State of California's Historic Resources Commission unanimously voted to add Johnie's Broiler to the State's Register of Historical Places. Approval of the property's owner was also required for inclusion in the registry but Smyrniotis objected on economic grounds. Nonetheless, the Broiler's "eligible" status offered the same protections as if it were actually listed.

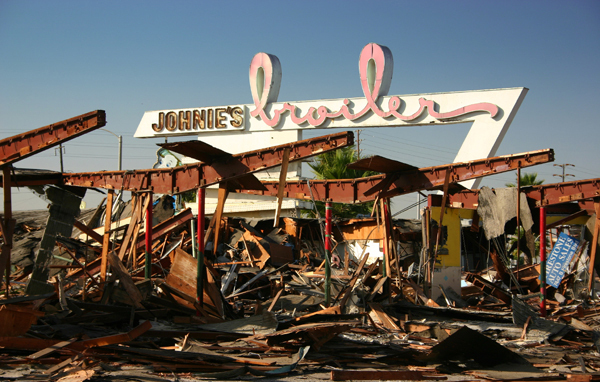
Johnie's Broiler after its demolition on Sunday, January 7, 2007.

In August 2006, owner Smyrniotis signed a lease with a new tenant, Ardas Yanik. Although the city of Downey rejected a demolition permit in November of that year, Yanik proceeded with plans to remove the structure anyway that following year. On Sunday, January 7, 2007, authorities halted demolition of Johnie's Broiler after a large amount of destruction had already been done. Bulldozers began their work around 3 p.m. even though the city still had not issued any demolition permits for the property.

Los Angeles Times reporter Valerie Reitman credited Helen Burns, who had been part of the 2002 drive to designate the restaurant as a state historic landmark, with noticing the demolition around 5 p.m. The original kitchen and the back of the coffee shop had been demolished by the time Burns arrived. She phoned the police and then began phoning other preservationists and car buffs, urging them to notify the police as well. Police arrived on the scene within a half-hour and stopped the illegal demolition. "People could have been injured or killed; the electrical was live," noted Downey City Councilman Mario Guerra. By the time police halted the demolition, much of the main structure had already been taken down, leaving the large main sign, front facade and car canopy structures still remaining upright. Yanik reportedly "pleaded no contest to three misdemeanor charges stemming from the demolition and had his lease forfeited."

Friends of Johnie's joined with fans, neighbors, classic car clubs, cruisers and preservationists to rally for Johnie's and coordinated the sale of T-shirts with events, cruises and kept attention focused on the demolished building.

Following its illegal demolition, preservationists and other supporters regrouped. These included the Mod-Com (Adriene Biondo, Chairperson), Friends of Johnie's (Analisa Ridenour, President) and the Coalition to Save and Rebuild Harvey's Broiler (Kevin Preciado, Leader).

=== Reconstruction as Bob's Big Boy ===
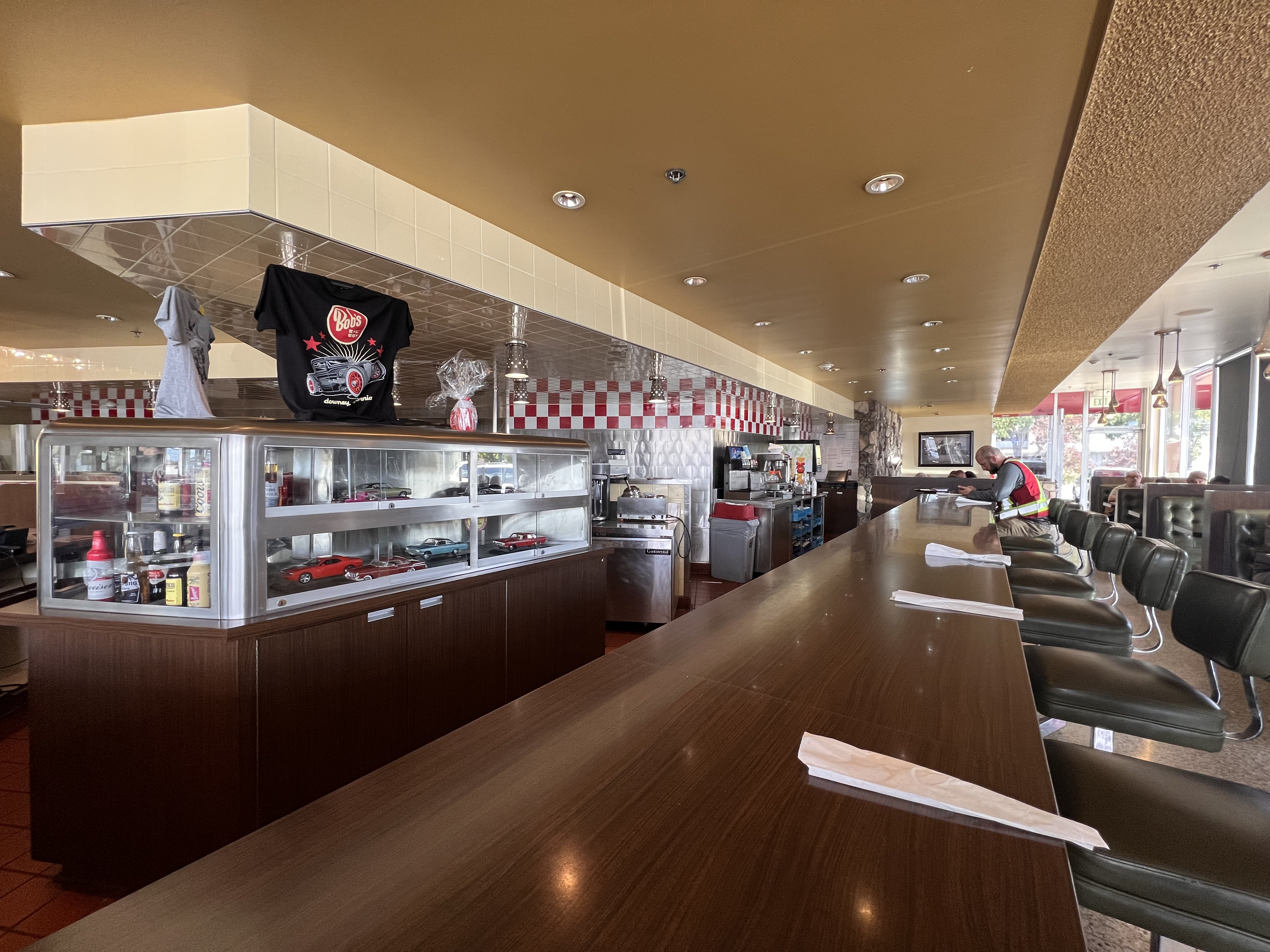
Counter area of the reconstructed restaurant in 2023

After the demolition was halted on January 7, 2007, the city council of Downey supported the efforts of citizens to preserve and restore the building. In April 2008, Jim Louder, owner of the Bob's Big Boy restaurant in Torrance, California, entered into a long-term lease agreement with Smyrniotis, the land owner. The restaurant was rebuilt with the help of Downey's Redevelopment Agency and the Downey Historical Society. Construction was completed and the restaurant opened as Bob's Big Boy Broiler in October 2009. The restaurant was rebuilt as a Bob's Big Boy Broiler which incorporated the surviving architectural elements of the old structure into the new restaurant that is based upon original blueprints.

Since opening under the new name, the restaurant has continued to host car shows and be used in TV and films.

In January 2021, a vinyl toy version of Bob's Big Boy Broiler, paired with a figurine of the Big Boy mascot, was released as a part of the popular Funko POP! series of pop culture collectibles.

In September 2024, a Bob's Big Boy statue outside the restaurant was severely damaged in a high speed car crash.

== Cruisers ==
During the Broiler's heyday, hot rods and "Kustom Kars" would cruise a route of popular carhop drive-in restaurants. One of the cruise circuits began in Long Beach at Grisinger's (now George's) drive-in, continuing on to Holly's in Hawthorne on to the Wich Stand on Slauson and Overhill, and ending in Downey at the Broiler. As many as 3,000 young people took part in the ritual on some nights.

In 1986, Lee McCullough requested and received funding and started up Harvey's Cruise Nite based on the success of an earlier cruise originated by Street Rodder magazine contributing editor and Harvey's alumni Burlie Burlile, in tribute to the Broiler's heyday of late 1950s and 1960s cruising. DJ Randy Roubal played oldies and hundreds of hot rods and vintage cars from the 1930s to the early 1970s attended the cruise nite on Wednesday evenings. The McCullough Cruise Nite continued until a July 1990 dispute with the property owner.

Cruisers returned in 1991 and car clubs like the Auto Butchers and Sultans continued the tradition until 1994, when enthusiasm waned. Much filming was done at the site and in October 1999, Harvey's-Johnie's was lit up once again. Rods & Customs lined its parking lot and craft services cooked up "Fat Boys" in the vein of "Chubby the Champ" – the Broiler's original double-deck hamburger.

Johnie's was featured on the December 1993 cover of Rod & Custom magazine.

== Movies and television ==
Bob's Big Boy Broiler has been featured in several popular movies and TV shows because of its authentic 1950s look. Some of the films and TV shows that it was featured in are:

- Bob Dylan's music video "Things Have Changed" (2000) was filmed at Johnie's Broiler.
- One Hour Photo, a 2002 motion picture directed by Mark Romanek, used Johnie's as the coffee shop where the Robin Williams' character has his meals. The illuminated outdoor neon sign is seen at the beginning of the first coffee shop scene.
- The Beach Boys: An American Family, a 2000 ABC-TV movie, used Johnie's as an authentic location depicting life in 1960s Los Angeles, complete with vintage hot rods and roadsters.
- The X-Files – Johnie's posed as a bus station for a 1999 episode
- Falcon Crest's 1988 episode "Rescue Me"
- License to Drive (1988), as "Archie's Atomic Drive-In"
- What's Love Got to Do with It (1993), as the coffee shop where the fight scene occurred between Ike & Tina Turner
- Can't Hardly Wait (1998), with a crane shot showing an aerial view of Johnie's and the Fat Boy
- Jawbreaker (1999)
- Unstrung Heroes (1995)
- Midnight Madness (1980)
- Reality Bites (1994)
- Short Cuts
- Sean Kingston's music video "Beautiful Girls"
- Jon B's music video "They don't know"
- Madonna's music video "What It Feels Like For A Girl"
- Goodie Mob's music video "What It Ain't (Ghetto Enuff)" featuring R&B trio TLC
- The Country Bears
- My Stepmother Is An Alien
- Riot (1997)
- Matchstick Men
- Heat (1995)
- The Game (1997)
- Mission: Impossible 2
- Bounce, in the scene where Gwyneth Paltrow and Ben Affleck exit the restaurant
- Rock group Staind's music video "For You" was partially filmed at Johnie's Broiler. The video includes interior and exterior shots of the original diner.
- Mad Men – portions of the 2010 season finale were filmed at the newly restored restaurant, now known as "Bob's Big Boy Broiler".
- Earth Girls Are Easy
- Superdrag music video for "Sucked Out"
- She's Out of Control
- Limp Bizkit music video for Take A Look Around (song)

== See also ==
- Johnie's Coffee Shop, another establishment featured in a number of Hollywood movies
- The Quality Cafe, also featured in Hollywood movies
