= Pann's =

Restaurant in Los Angeles, USA

Coordinates: 33.978115°N 118.370566°W

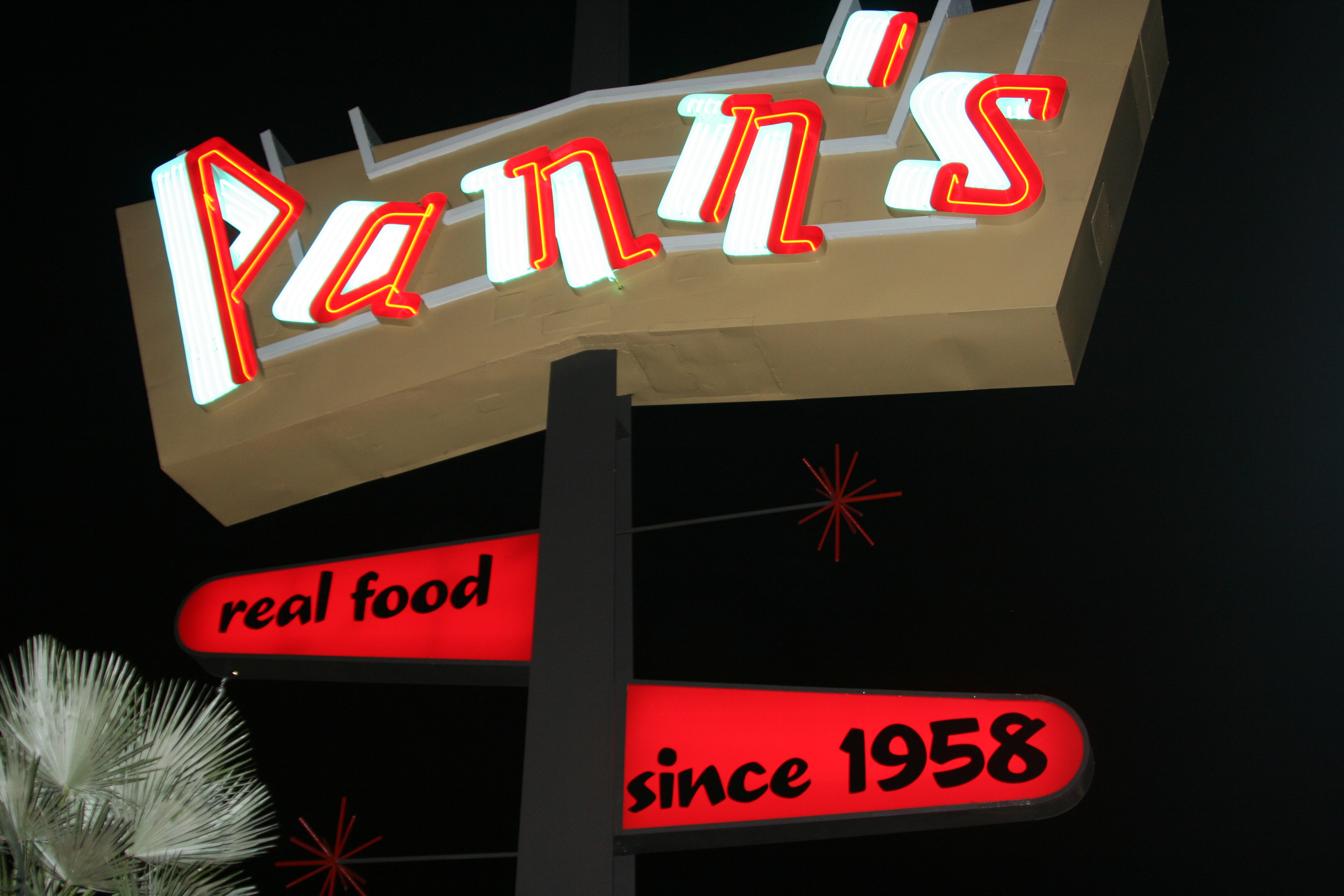
- Pole signs at the restaurant
- Interactive map of Pann's

Restaurant information
- Established: 1958; 68 years ago in Los Angeles, California, United States
- Owners: Rena Poulos and son Jim Poulos
- Previous owners: George and Rena Poulos
- Food type: Breakfast and lunch food served until mid-afternoon
- Location: 6710 S La Tijera Blvd, Westchester, Los Angeles, California, United States
- Other information: The building is one of the best preserved examples of Davis' Googie designs; The restaurant has been featured in films such as xXx and Bewitched.
- Website: www.panns.com

Pann's is a coffee shop restaurant in the Westchester neighborhood of Los Angeles, California, known for its history, role in movies, and distinctive architecture. The restaurant was opened by husband and wife George and Rena Poulos in 1958. It is also known for its neon sign, Googie architecture, and 1950s decor. The building and its iconic neon sign were designed by architects Eldon Davis and Helen Liu Fong of the Armet & Davis architectural firm. Pann's remains one of the best preserved examples of Davis' Googie designs, according to the Los Angeles Times.

Like many coffee shops it serves breakfast and lunch until mid-afternoon (closed for dinner) every day. The restaurant also serves "blue-plate specials," complete meals that vary daily.

Pann's includes an angular edifice and large plate glass windows and has been described as having "the classic coffee shop architecture". It was designed by Helen Liu Fong, who also designed the Holiday Bowl, Johnie's coffee shop, and the original Norms Restaurant. She included tropical landscaping in the design, and was part of the firm of Armet & Davis that one commentator refers to as "the Frank Lloyd Wright of 1950s coffee shops." Pann's is currently owned by George and Rena's son Jim Poulos. Rena Poulos died at age 100 in 2017. Ed Begley, Jr. told a story about running into César Chávez at Pann's in the 1980s.

Pann's was featured in a story in the Los Angeles Times, "Going on a hunt for Googie architecture," which noted the restaurant's tilted roof and geometric sign, tropical plants, checkerboard tile floor, and exposed, rustic stone walls indoors and out, and full-wall glass windows wrapping around the restaurant. Pann's celebrated its 50th anniversary in 2008.

== Recognition ==
- Winner of the Los Angeles Conservancy Preservation Award
- Pann's has operated under a number of snappy mottoes, including "Just Food, Service and Rock & Roll."
- The restaurant has been featured in films such as xXx, Next, and Bewitched
- Contrary to popular belief, Pulp Fiction was not filmed at Pann's; it was filmed at another restaurant owned by the Poulos family, Holly’s, in Hawthorne.
