= The Boobé Sisters =

American comedy singing group

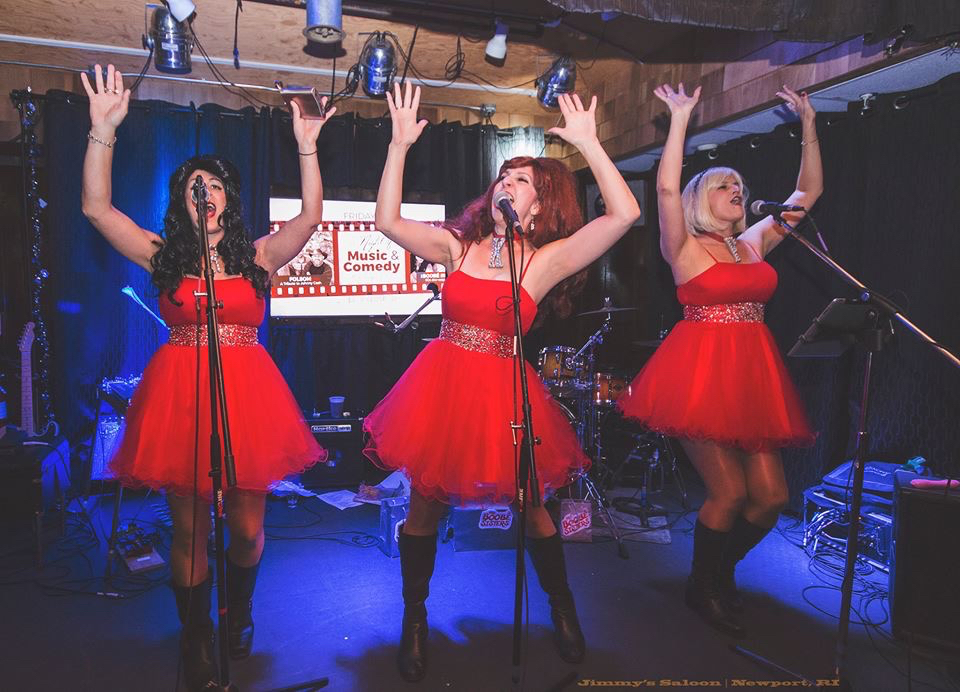
- From left to right: Leah Finkelstein (Reneé Boobé), Karen Volpe (Kayé Boobé), and Heather Stewart (Fayé Boobé).

Background information
- Origin: Los Angeles, California, U.S.
- Genres: Doo-wop; 1960's Pop; Comedy
- Years active: 2013–2018
- Website: theboobesisters.com

The Boobé Sisters were an American comedy singing group from Los Angeles, California. They were a spoof of a 1960s girl group, consisting of actresses, songwriters, producers and comediennes Leah Finkelstein (Reneé Boobé), Heather Stewart (Fayé Boobé), and Karen Volpe (Kayé Boobé). The group became regulars at Flappers Comedy Club in Burbank.

== History ==
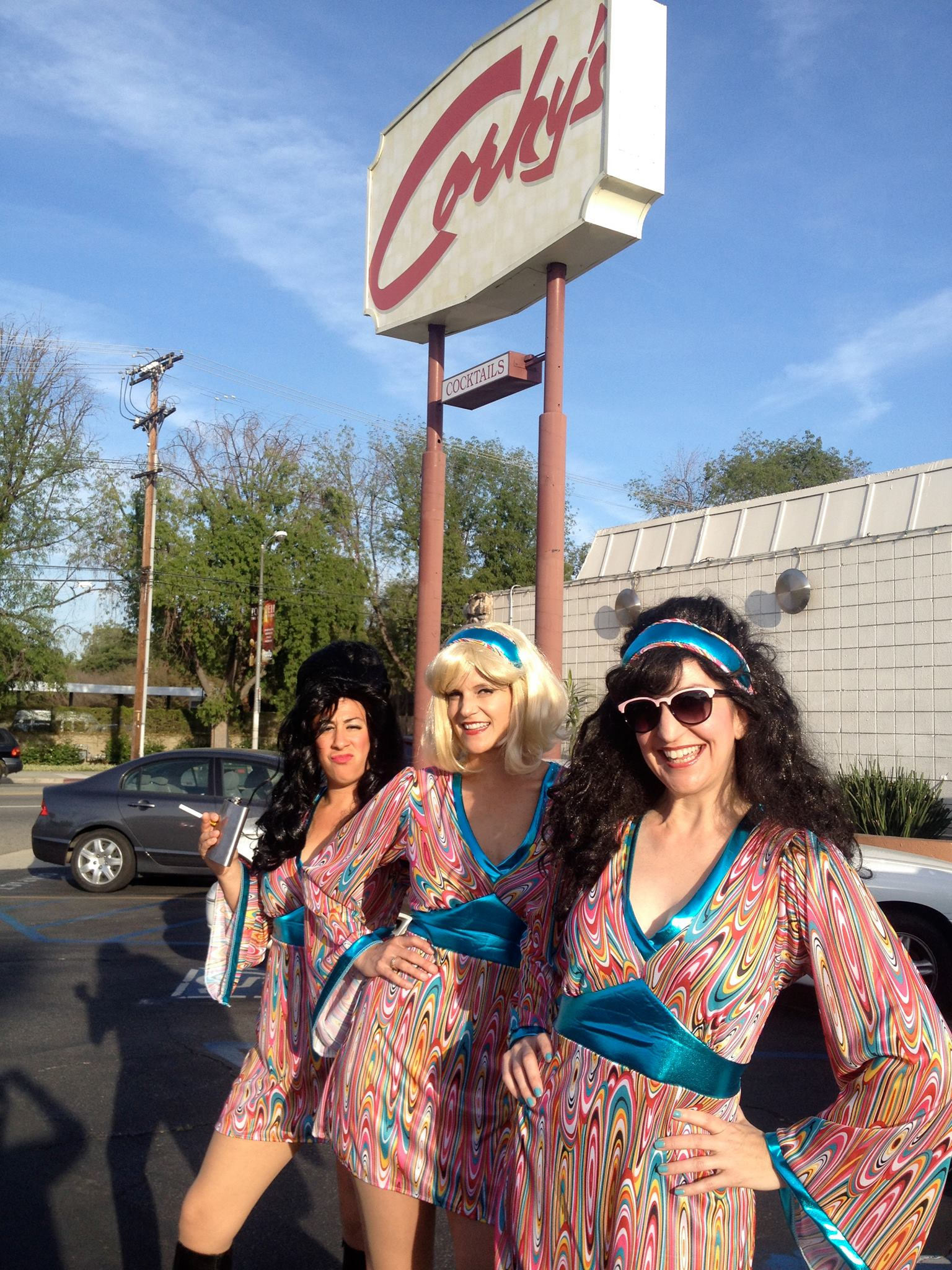
During earlier shows at The Cork Lounge

The idea to start a singing group was conceived by Finkelstein, who introduced Volpe and Stewart and formed the trio. Initially the group started out doing shows as a Doo-wop cover band at The Cork Lounge in Corky's Restaurant in Sherman Oaks, CA. Unsatisfied by the crowd’s lack of response, they started changing the lyrics to make the songs funny and get a reaction out of the audience. From then on they became a parody comedy group. Their songs were about the trio’s purported drug use, sexual prowess and frequent run-ins with the law, as well as their friendship and sisterhood.

The group started performing at various comedy clubs throughout Los Angeles and performed at The Funny Women's Festival at iO West in November 2014.

On February 27, 2016, they presented Worst Screen Combo at the 36th Golden Raspberry Awards. In May, they appeared on season 11 of America's Got Talent. They self-released their debut album Greatest Tits: Volume One on Mazel Tov Records in October and finished off the year with a short East Coast Tour to support the album.

In June 2017, they performed badly on The Gong Show and produced and starred in their web series Beneath the Music. In December they performed at Santathon, hosted by Fred Willard and starring Jo Anne Worley.

In April 2018, they sang the National Anthem at the Lake Elsinore Storm baseball game.

Karen Volpe died in December 2019.

== Influences ==
Comedic influences include Weird Al Yankovic, Lucille Ball, Steve Martin, Gilda Radner, Carol Burnett, Catherine O'Hara, Lily Tomlin, The Blues Brothers, The Monkees, and Sarah Silverman.

Musical influences include The Shirelles, The Cookies, Martha and the Vandellas, The Four Seasons, The Crystals, Lyle Lovett, Janis Joplin, Carole King, Aretha Franklin, and Bette Midler.

== Appearances and tours ==
- The Movie Guys podcast - December 2013
- The Baub Show, UBN Radio - December 2015
- Burbank Comedy Festival Winning Best of Fest - August 2016
- East Coast Tour - October 2016
- Hollywood Close-up Podcast - December 2016
- East Coast Tour - July 2017
- Songs in the Key of Funny podcast - December 2017
