= Kork =

Kork may refer to:

== Places ==
- Kork, Germany, a district of Kehl, Germany
  - Kork station
- Kork, Kerman, a village in Kerman Province, Iran

== People ==
- Kork (surname), Estonian surname
- Kork Ballington (born 1951), South African motorcycle racer

== See also ==
- Cork (disambiguation)
- KORK (disambiguation)
