= Hope International University =

Private Christian university in Fullerton, California, U.S.

Hope International University (HIU)
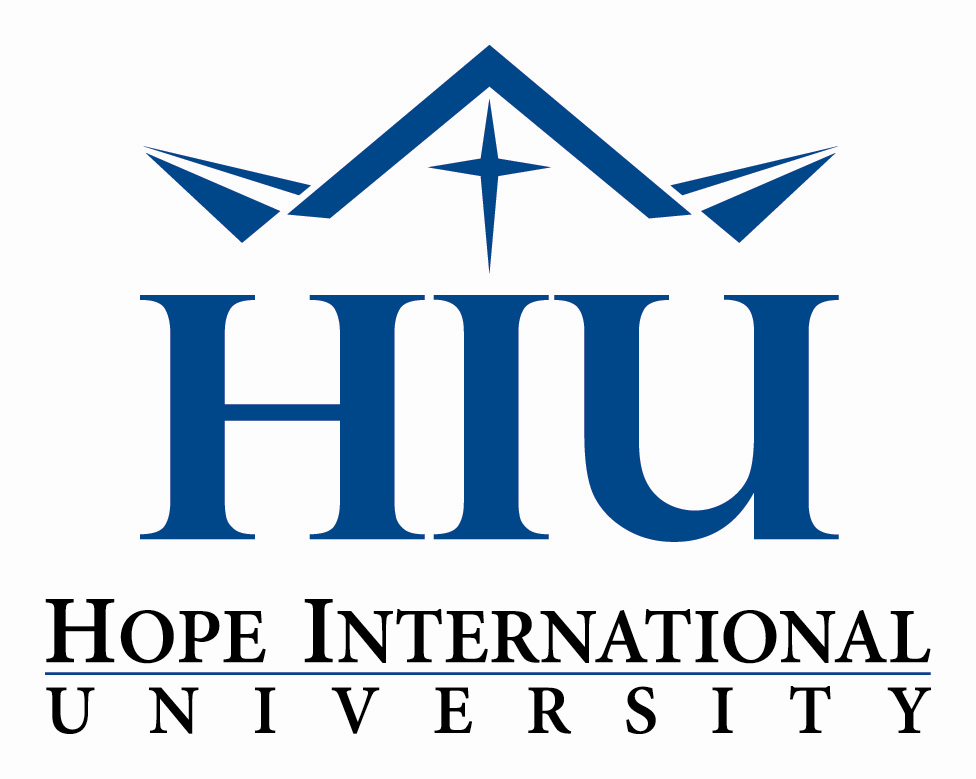
- Other names: HIU; Hope
- Former names: Pacific Bible Seminary (1928–1962); Pacific Christian College (1962–1997)
- Type: Private university
- Established: 1928
- Religious affiliation: Christian
- President: Paul Alexander
- Students: 1,140
- Location: Fullerton, California, U.S. 33°52′36″N 117°53′07″W
- Campus: Urban
- Colors: Blue, Grey & White
- Sporting affiliations: NAIA – GSAC
- Mascot: Royals
- Website: www.hiu.edu

Hope International University is a private Christian university in Fullerton, California, United States. It enrolls around 1,140 students. While Hope is non-denominational, it has strong ties to the Restoration Movement and the Christian churches and churches of Christ. Hope is accredited by the Western Association of Schools and Colleges (WASC). Hope International University's Fullerton campus sits adjacent to California State University, Fullerton, with which it has contract programs. Enrollment stands at just under 1,200 students.

== Programs ==
Hope International University consists of five colleges, which include various programs: Pacific Christian College of Ministry & Biblical Studies, College of Arts and Sciences, College of Psychology and Counseling, College of Education, and College of Business and Management.

The university teaches students leadership and service-focused education through undergraduate and graduate degree programs in business, education, ministry, music, psychology, human development and other social sciences.

=== Accreditation ===
Hope has been regionally accredited by the Western Association of Schools and Colleges Senior College and University Commission (WSCUC) since 1969, and in 2006 it received additional accreditation from the Association for Biblical Higher Education. Additional accreditations and certifications include the California Commission on Teacher Credentialing (CCTC), the Commission of Accreditation for Marriage and Family Therapy Education (COAMFTE), and the Board of Behavioral Sciences in California. Hope is also authorized by the Washington Student Achievement Council for Washington State and is a member of the Council for Christian Colleges and Universities.

== Campuses ==
=== Main campus ===
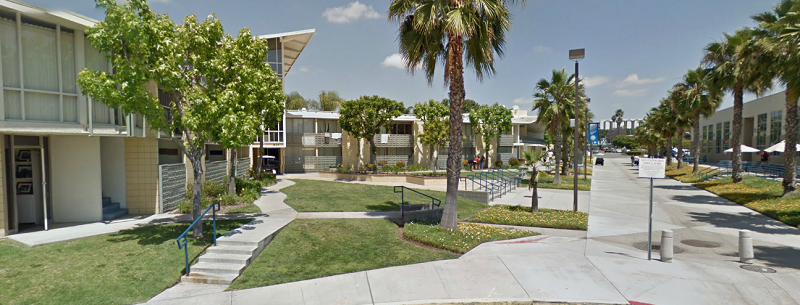
Hope International University

Hope International University's main campus is located in North Orange County, in the city of Fullerton, California. The university's library, student center, gymnasium, student dining facilities, bookstore, on-campus housing, and main administrative offices are located on the Fullerton campus, as are the classrooms, faculty offices, and administrative offices.

The majority of the buildings on the main campus were built by California State University, Fullerton. There originally was a student center, movie theater (the Titan Theater), and dormitories built by the CSU Foundation in the late 1960s. These are some of few remaining examples of pure Googie-style architecture in southern California, considered by some to be the largest collection of Googie modernist architecture remaining in the world. The buildings were designed by Eldon Davis, who, along with partner Louis Armet, founded one of the most renowned architectural firms in Los Angeles history. Armet & Davis essentially defined the Googie architecture genre in the post-war period.

The Hope Counseling Center, providing professional counseling services to the campus and the community is also operated from this location.

=== Nebraska Christian College ===
In 2016, Hope International University merged with Nebraska Christian College.

The NCC campus in Papillion, NE, spanned 80+ acres of land with 60,000 square feet of classrooms, dorm suites, student center, cafeteria, and faculty/staff offices. There were also two four-plex apartment buildings for married students. The Ministry Equipping Center (MEC) had a 500-seat auditorium as well as classrooms, practice rooms, voice/audio editing suites, a preaching lab, and a coffee bar. NCC additionally operated an athletics program separate from HIU. It was announced in April 2020 that HIU would be shutting down the Nebraska Christian College campus following the conclusion of the 2020 academic year.

History at a glance
Pacific Bible Seminary	Established	1928
Pacific Christian College	Renamed	1962
Hope International University	Renamed	1997

== Athletics ==
The Hope International athletic teams are called the Royals. The university is a member of the National Association of Intercollegiate Athletics (NAIA), primarily competing in the Golden State Athletic Conference (GSAC) for most of its sports since the 1999–2000 academic year; while its competitive dance teams do not have a conference and compete at the NAIA level as unaffiliated teams. They were also a member of the National Christian College Athletic Association (NCCAA), primarily competing as an independent in the West Region of the Division I level.

Hope International competes in 21 intercollegiate varsity sports: Men's sports include baseball, basketball, cross country, golf, soccer, tennis, wrestling, track & field (indoor and outdoor) and volleyball; women's sports include basketball, beach volleyball, competitive dance, cross country, golf, soccer, softball, stunt, tennis, wrestling, track & field (indoor and outdoor) and volleyball.

== See also ==
- List of colleges and universities in California
