= Corke =

Corke is a surname.

People named Corke include:

- Anya Corke (born 1990), Hong Kong chess grandmaster
- Fiona Corke (born 1961), Australian actress
- Hilary Corke (1921–2001), British writer, composer and mineralogist
- Kevin Corke (fl. 1990–present), United States television news correspondent
- Martin Corke (1923–1994), English cricketer and businessman
- Peter Corke (born 1959), Australian roboticist
- Terrence Corke (born 1955), Jamaican cricketer

== See also ==
- Cork (surname)
- Corky (disambiguation)
