= Holiday Bowl (disambiguation) =

Holiday Bowl or Holidaybowl may refer to:

- Holiday Bowl, an annual American college football bowl game in San Diego, California
- Holiday Bowl (building), a former bowling alley on Crenshaw Boulevard in Los Angeles, California
- Holiday Bowl (NAIA), NAIA division I football national championship game from 1957 to 1960
