= Armet Davis Newlove Architects =

Architectural firm in Santa Monica, California, USA

Practice information
- Partners: Victor Newlove; John Dodson; Paul Deppe
- Founded: 1947
- Location: Santa Monica, California
- Coordinates: 34.0192983°N 118.4806483°W

Significant works and honors
- Buildings: Holiday Bowl; Norms Restaurants; Pann's

Armet Davis Newlove Architects (/ɑːrˈmeɪ/ arm-AY), formerly Armét & Davis, is a Californian architectural firm known for working in the Googie architecture style that marks many distinctive coffee shops and eateries in Southern California. The firm designed Pann's, the first Norms Restaurants location, the Holiday Bowl and many other iconic locations.

== History ==
The architectural firm was formed by Louis Armét and Eldon Davis in 1947. Victor Newlove joined the practice in 1963 and became a partner in 1972, changing the firm's name to Armét Davis Newlove Architects. According to the firm's website, it has designed over 4,000 buildings in the United States, Canada, Mexico, and Indonesia.

Some of the firm's design hallmarks included radically vaulted roofing, a room-length dining counter and an outsized comet-shaped signage to beckon drivers from off the street. Armét & Davis have been referred to as "the Frank Lloyd Wright of '50s coffee shops." "According to critic Philip Langdon, Armét & Davis designs came to define 'coffee shop' for much of America." Their Holiday Bowl bowling alley served cultural, architectural, and recreational purposes for the Crenshaw district. The firm is said to have "defined '50s Googie architecture."

Pann's was designed by Helen Liu Fong, who joined the firm in 1951, and included tropical landscaping. She also designed the Holiday Bowl, Johnie's Coffee Shop, and the original Norms Restaurant. On the 90th birthday of Eldon Davis, fans joined him for a meal at Norms and a tour of some of the buildings the firm designed. The firm also designed Schwab's drugstore on Sunset Boulevard.

Photographer Jack Laxer took stereoscopic photos of the firm's work, like the Holiday Bowl bowling alley on Crenshaw Boulevard (circa 1957) and Norms Restaurant on Slauson Avenue, using a Stereo Realist camera. Armét & Davis was one of his key clients. These slides were shown at California Science Center IMAX theater in November 2001, where the 3D-effect could be experienced by visitors using polarized glasses.

The firm also designed hotels, such as a Sheraton in Canada, a Lutheran church, animal shelter and schools. L&B Manufacturing in Santa Monica produced seating for many of the coffee shops that were designed by Armét & Davis.

== Buildings ==
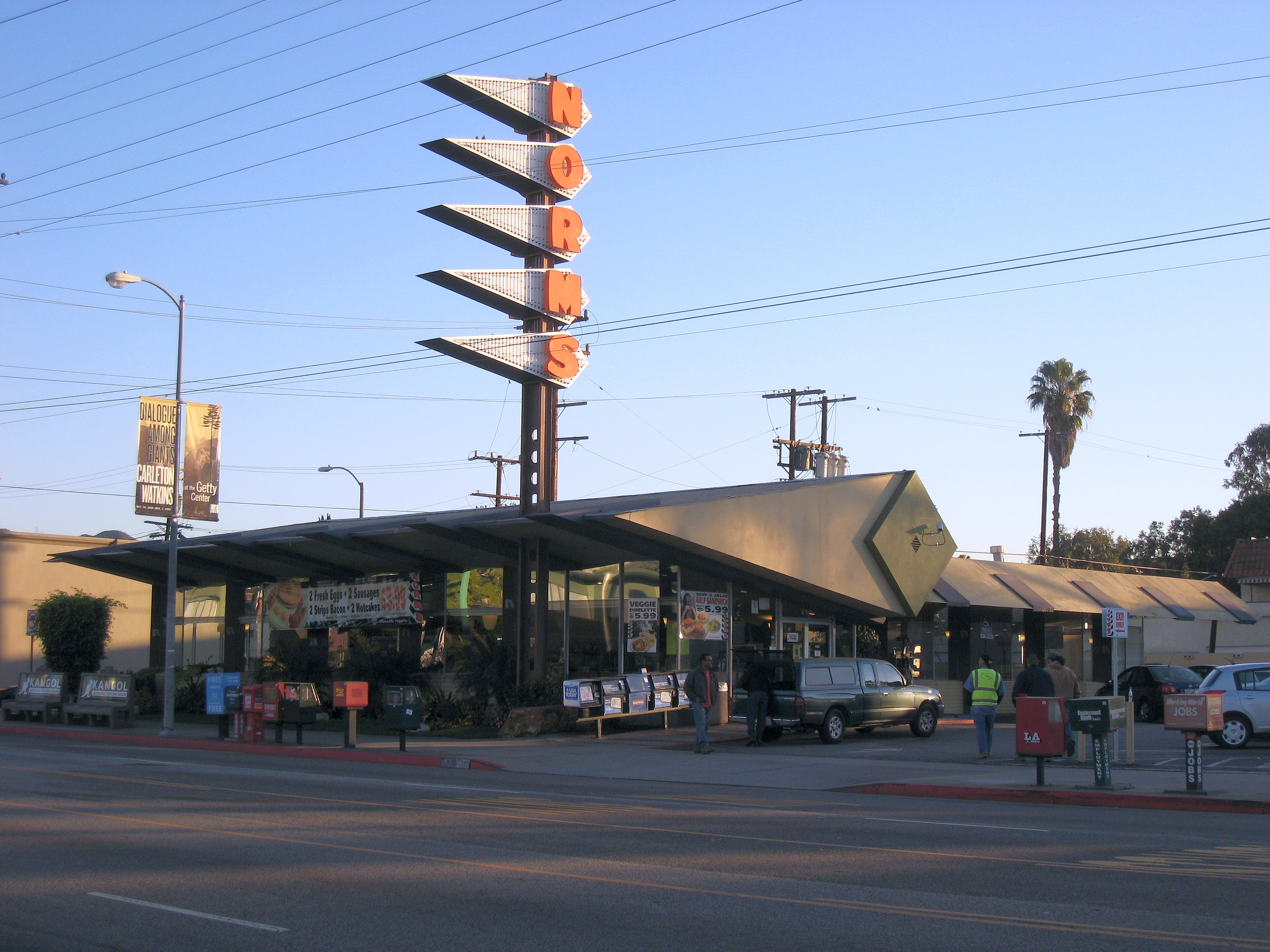
Norms Restaurant, Los Angeles, 2009

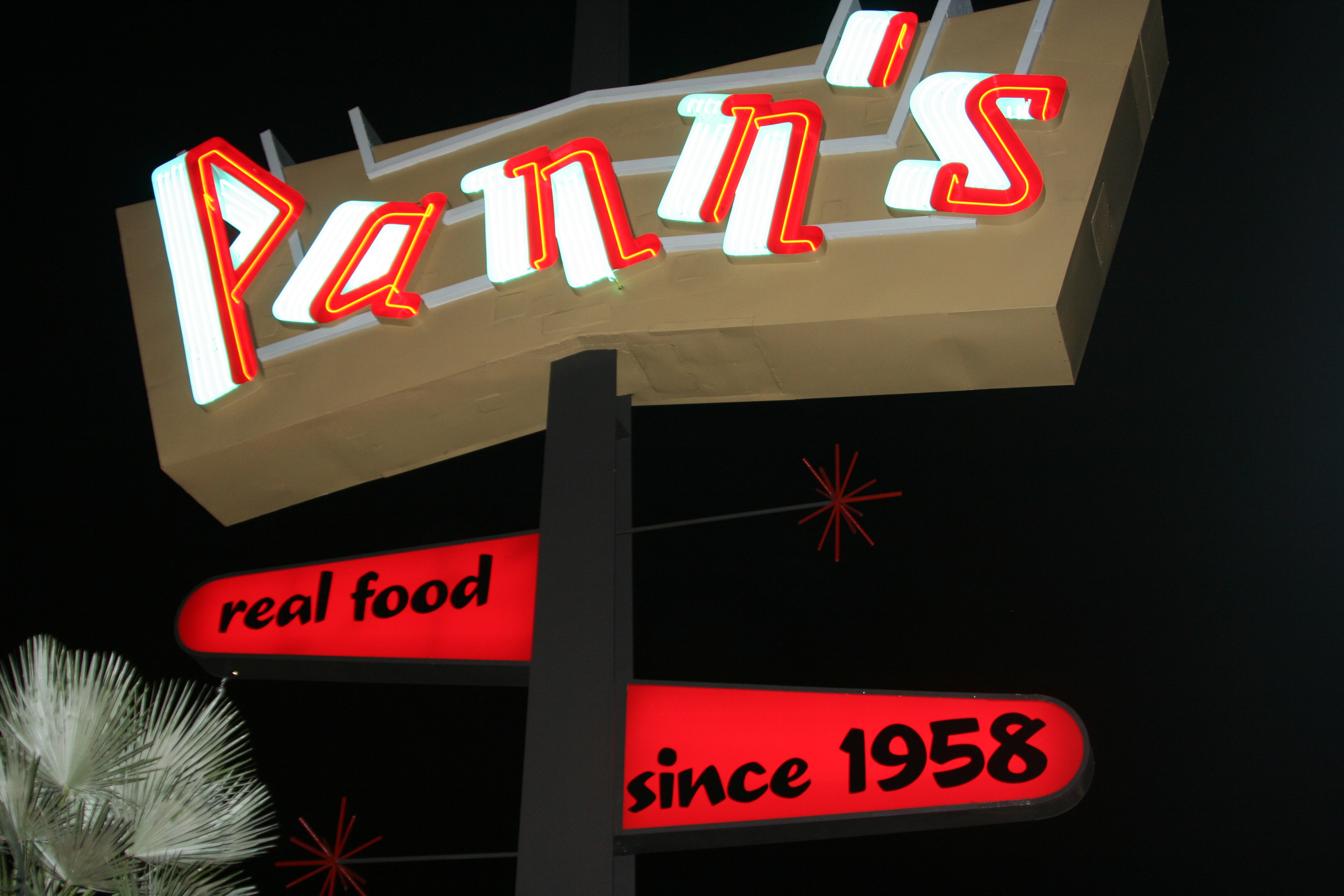
Pole signs at Pann's Restaurant, Los Angeles, 2009

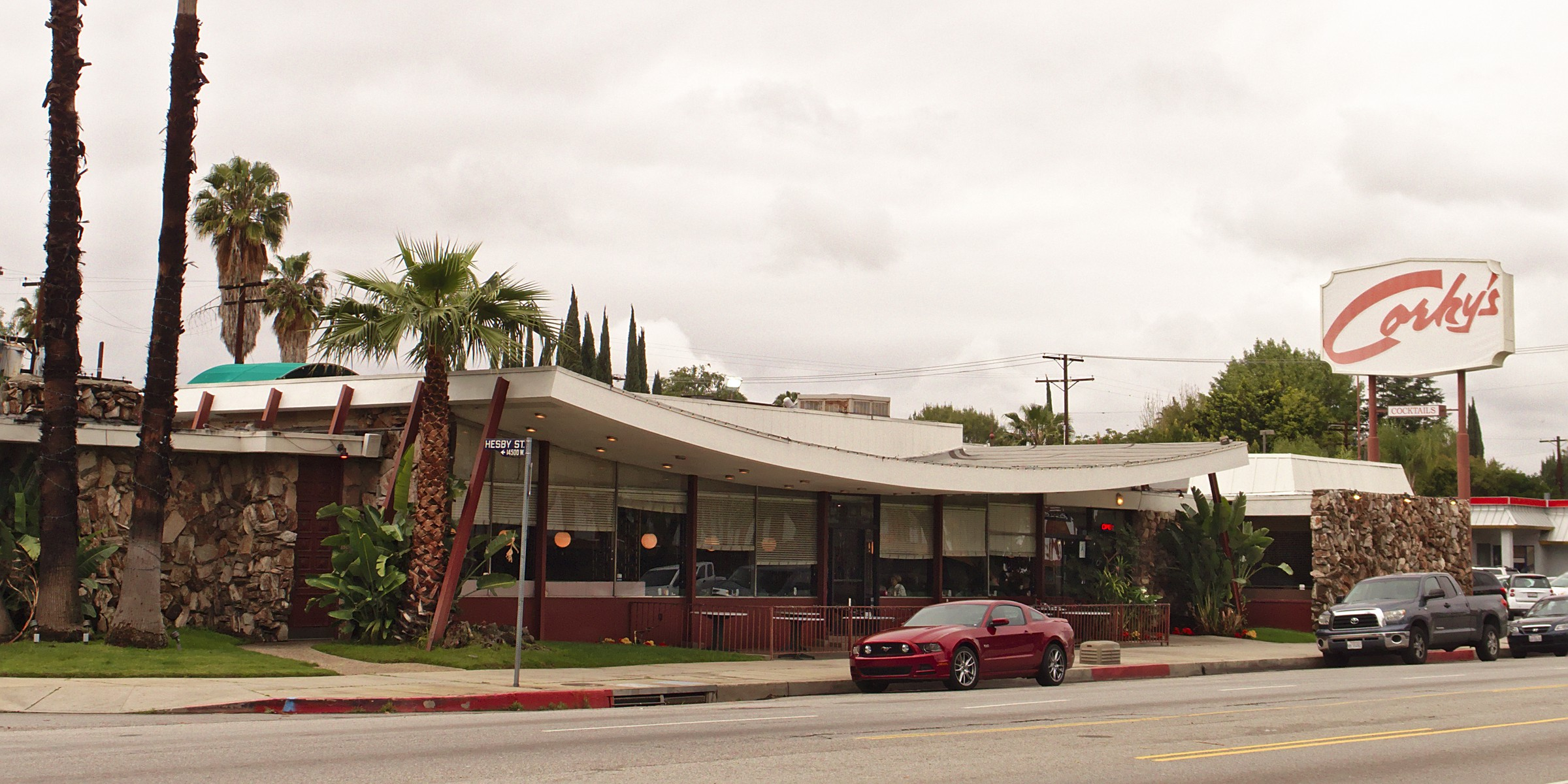
Corky's Restaurant, Sherman Oaks, 2014

- Kerry's Coffee shop (now a Mel's Drive-In), Sherman Oaks (1947)
- Romeo's Times Square / Johnie's Wilshire (1955)
- Holly's / Hawthorne Grill (1956)
- Falcon Coffee Shop, Hawthorne (1956)
- Norms Restaurant, West Hollywood (1957)
- Ship's Restaurant, La Cienega & Olympic Blvd, Los Angeles, CA (1950s)
- Holiday Bowl, Crenshaw Manor, Crenshaw Blvd & W 38th St, Los Angeles, CA (converted into Starbucks in 2006) (1958)
- Pann's Restaurant, Westchester (1958)
- Wich Stand, Wilshire & Baldwin Hills (1958)
- Conrad's (originally Donly's, then Conrad's, now Astro Family Restaurant), Silver Lake (1958)
- Stanley Burke's (then Lamplighter, now Corky's), Sherman Oaks (1958)
- Denny's, Van Nuys (1958)
- The Steak House (restaurant & nightclub), 8622 S Western Ave, Los Angeles, CA (now a laundromat) (1959)
- Penguin Coffee Shop (now Mel's Drive In), Santa Monica (1959)
- Denny's, North Hollywood (1960)
- Twain's Restaurant, Studio City (1960)
- Hope International University, Fullerton
- Sam's Cafe, Glendale
- Glen Capri Motel, Glendale
- Biff's Coffee Shop, Oakland (1963)
- Prebles (later Sandi's Family Restaurant), Alhambra
- Bob's Big Boy #23, Alhambra #34, Northridge, Bob's Big Boy #135 (Now Coco's), Mission Hills, #147 (now Coco's) Pasadena, #158, Glendale #181, Van Nuys (1980)
- Lulu's Restaurant, Van Nuys
- Norms #6, Hawthorne Boulevard; Norms #8, Slauson Ave., Huntington Park; Norms Restaurant, Long Beach
- Ron-dee Coffee Shop, San Fernando (demolished 2004)
- St. Andrew's Presbyterian Church, Redondo Beach
