= Quality Cafe (diner) =

Defunct diner in Los Angeles, California

Coordinates: 34.052057°N 118.266857°W

- Interactive map of Quality Cafe
- Location: 1236 West 7th Street, Los Angeles, California, U.S.
- Type: Diner, film set

Construction
- Closed: 2006
- Demolished: 2014

The Quality Cafe (also known as Quality Diner) was a diner at 1236 West 7th Street in Los Angeles, California.

The cafe ceased to function as a diner in 2006 but has appeared as a location featured in a number of Hollywood films, including Million Dollar Baby, Training Day, Old School, Seven, Ghost World, Gone in 60 Seconds, The Stepfather, What's Love Got to Do with It, Sex and Death 101, and Catch Me If You Can.

It was also featured in Season 1 of the 2007 television series Mad Men, in the episode "5G". It was completely refurbished in 2014 and transformed into a bar of the Teragram Ballroom, a music theatre.

The location's exterior also appeared in Atlas Shrugged and in You Got Served.

== Film appearances ==
- P.I. Private Investigations (1987), crime film
- Naked Lie (1989), TV Movie, starring Victoria Principal and James Farentino
- What’s Love Got to Do with It (1993), the life of Ike and Tina Turner, starring Laurence Fishburne and Angela Bassett
- Percy & Thunder (1993), starring James Earl Jones and Courtney B. Vance. The diner was largely refurbished.
- Ed Wood (1994), starring Johnny Depp, Patricia Arquette, Lisa Marie and Ned Bellamy
- Se7en (1995), starring Morgan Freeman and Gwyneth Paltrow
- B.A.P.S. (1997), starring Halle Berry and Natalie Desselle
- Another Day in Paradise (1998), starring James Woods, Melanie Griffith, Vincent Kartheiser and Natasha Gregson Wagner
- Gone in 60 Seconds (2000), starring Nicolas Cage and Grace Zabriskie
- Coyote Ugly (2000), starring Piper Perabo and Tyra Banks
- Training Day (2001), starring Denzel Washington and Ethan Hawke
- Ghost World (2001), starring Scarlett Johansson and Thora Birch
- Catch Me If You Can (2002), starring Tom Hanks
- The Rules of Attraction (2002), starring James Van Der Beek and Thomas Ian Nicholas
- Old School (2003), starring Luke Wilson and Ellen Pompeo
- Million Dollar Baby (2004), starring Morgan Freeman and Hilary Swank
- Mr and Mrs Smith (2005), starring Brad Pitt and Vince Vaughn, second scène starring also Angelina Jolie
- Sex and Death 101 (2007), starring Winona Ryder and Simon Baker
- The Heartbreak Kid (2007), starring Ben Stiller and Malin Akerman
- Reign Over Me (2007), starring Adam Sandler, Don Cheadle and John de Lancie
- The Midnight Meat Train (2008), starring Leslie Bibb and Bradley Cooper
- The Stepfather (2009), starring Dylan Walsh and Penn Badgley
- 500 Days of Summer (2009), starring Zooey Deschanel and Joseph Gordon-Levitt
- Devil (2010), starring Chris Messina
- The Roommate (2011), starring Leighton Meester and Minka Kelly
- Honey 2 (2011), dance film

== Appearances in TV series ==
- MacGyver Episode : A prisoner of conscience (1987)
- Beyond Belief: Fact or Fiction Stories: The Candlestick, The Diner (1997)
- Seven Days Episode: Walter (1999)
- Night Stalker Episode: Pilot (2005)
- Numb3rs Episode: Blowback (2008)
- The Riches Season 2 Episode 5: Trust never sleeps (2008)
- Castle Episodes: Sucker Punch (2010) and Watershed (2013)
- CSI: New York Episode: Outside Man (2004), Sweet Jane (2007)
- Mad Men Several episodes, including: 5G, Ladies Room, To Have and to Hold, Christmas Waltz
- Lie to Me, Episode: Headlock (2010)
- Criminal Minds, Episodes: Limelight (2008), Public Enemy (2010)

== Other appearances ==
- Coca-Cola commercial Share the Magic (2009) by Mike L Murphy
- Pepsi Max commercial 2pointZero (2010), a remake of the famous cola war commercial of 1995
- Joe's Diner, about 20 promos for the NFL Network matches during the season 2006-2007 and a TV commercial "Cable Guy"
- Monk and Psych promo Dead Zone Cafe
- Chevrolet Cobalt commercial "Ball" (2005)
- "Cold Beverage" music video by G. Love & Special Sauce (1994)
- "One more chance" music video by Art Porter Jr (1996)
- "All the Things (Your Man Won't Do)" music video by American R&B singer Joe (1996), video by Paul Hunter
- cover photo of the single Hate My Life by Theory of a Deadman

== See also ==
- Johnie's Coffee Shop, a similar eating establishment featured in a number of Hollywood movies
- Johnie's Broiler
