= Martin Corke =

English cricketer

Personal information
- Full name: Martin Dewe Corke
- Born: 8 June 1923; Murree, Punjab, British Raj
- Died: 14 January 1994 (aged 70); Bury St Edmunds, Suffolk, England
- Batting: Right-handed
- Relatives: Ronald Lake (uncle)

Domestic team information
- Years: Team
- 1946–1964: Suffolk

Career statistics
Competition	First-class
Matches	5
Runs scored	116
Batting average	11.60
100s/50s	–/1
Top score	53
Balls bowled	–
Wickets	–
Bowling average	–
5 wickets in innings	–
10 wickets in match	–
Best bowling	–
Catches/stumpings	–/–
- Source: Cricinfo, 5 May 2013

Martin Dewe Corke OBE (8 June 1923 – 14 January 1994) was an English cricketer. Corke was a right-handed batsman. He was also a prominent member of the Greene King Brewery.

== Early life ==
A member of the Greene brewing dynasty, Corke was born at the hill station of Murree in the British Raj, where his father, then Captain Francis Sinclair Corke, was serving with the 1st battalion 16th Punjab Regiment. He was sent home from the Raj to be educated in England, where he attended Radley School, during which time he captained the school's cricket team. By age fifteen he was working at the family brewery in Bury St Edmunds, Suffolk. However, with the start of World War II in 1939, Corke returned to the Raj to be with his parents. He was commissioned in his father's 16th Punjab Regiment in 1942 then later promoted lieutenant. In 1944, he was struck down with tuberculosis, which ended his time in the British Indian Army.

== Cricket and later life ==
Returning to England, he married Jean Armour, daughter of artist George Denholm Armour, in 1946. He made his debut for Suffolk against Berkshire in that same seasons Minor Counties Championship. He played regularly for Suffolk throughout the 1950s and into the 1960s, making a total of 105 appearances for the county, the last of which came against Cambridgeshire in 1964. He scored over 3,000 runs for the county, as well as captaining it for eleven seasons from 1954 to 1964. Corke also played first-class cricket for the Free Foresters, making his first-class debut against Cambridge University at Fenner's in 1953. He made four further first-class appearances for the Free Foresters, the last of which came against Oxford University at the University Parks in 1958. He scored 116 runs in his five first-class matches, at an average of 11.60 and a high score of 53, his only first-class half century.

His commitments to the brewery saw him become a director of Greene King, during which himself and his fellow directors resisted takeover manoeuvres from larger rivals; his directorship saw him have notable success as marketing director. In 1961, he became a magistrate, while he began work alongside his business commitments for the West Suffolk Health Authority, leading to his chairmanship of the organisation from 1982 to 1993, working which he later received an OBE for his services to the National Health Service in the Queen's 1993 Birthday Honours. He held further positions as chairman of St Edmundsbury Bench as chairman of Suffolk County Cricket Club.

He died at from cancer at Bury St Edmunds, Suffolk on 14 January 1994. His uncle Ronald Lake also played first-class cricket.
