= Corky =

- Gender: Unisex, primarily male

Origin
- Languages: English, Irish
- Meaning: "hill hollow"

Other names
- Variant forms: Corki, Corkie, Korki, Korkie, Korky

Corky means cork-like. It is an English and Irish unisex name that also serves as a nickname. It may also refer to:

== People ==
=== Sportspeople ===
- Corky Ballas (born 1960), American competitive ballroom dancer
- Corky or Corkie Blow (1877–1938), English footballer
- Corky Calhoun (born 1950), American former National Basketball Association player
- Corky Carroll (born 1947), American surfer
- Dominic Cork (born 1971), English cricketer, nicknamed Corky
- Corky de Graauw (born 1951), Dutch ice hockey player
- Corky Devlin (1931–1995), American National Basketball Association player
- Corky McMillin (1925–2005), American off-road desert racer and land developer
- Corky Miller (born 1976), American Major League Baseball player
- Corky Nelson (1939–2014), American high school and college football player and coach
- Corky Palmer (born 1954), American college baseball coach
- Corky Rogers (1943–2020), American high school football coach
- Corky Valentine (1929–2005), American Major League Baseball pitcher
- Claire Corky (born 1984), New Zealand rugby union player

=== Musicians ===
- Corky Cornelius (1914–1943), American jazz trumpeter
- Corky Hale (born 1936), American jazz musician
- Corky James (born 1954), American guitarist and bassist
- Corky Jones, pseudonym used by Buck Owens (1929–2006) for his rockabilly music
- Corky Laing (born 1948), Canadian rock drummer
- Corky Siegel (born 1943), American musician and composer

=== Artists ===
- Corwin Clairmont (born 1946), Native American artist
- Corky Lee (1947–2021), American photographer
- Corky Quakenbush, American stop motion filmmaker
- Corky Trinidad (1939–2009), Philippine-American editorial cartoonist and comics artist

=== Politicians and activists ===
- Corky Evans (born 1948), Canadian politician
- Rodolfo Gonzales (1928–2005), Chicano boxer, poet and political activist
- Corky Peterson, Canadian politician and trapper

=== Other professions ===
- Charles A. Marvin (1929–2003), American judge and district attorney; see Louisiana Political Museum and Hall of Fame
- Corky McCorquodale (1904–1968), American poker player
- Corin Nemec (born 1971), American actor
- Claude Nowell (1944–2008), also known as "Corky King" or "Corky Ra", American founder of Summum, a philosophical and religious organization
- Gaetano Vastola (gangster) (born 1928), American mobster

== Fictional characters ==
- Corky Caporale, a character in the television series The Sopranos
- James "Corky" Corcoran, a character in the "Ukridge" stories of P. G. Wodehouse
- Corky, in the 1996 film Bound
- Corky, in the animated television series The Adventures of Bottle Top Bill and His Best Friend Corky
- Corky Romano, in the 2001 film Corky Romano
- Corky Sherwood, in the television series Murphy Brown
- Corky Shimatzu, a character in the animated television series The Adventures of Jimmy Neutron: Boy Genius
- Corky St. Clair, in the 1996 film Waiting for Guffman
- Charles "Corky" Thatcher, in the television series Life Goes On
- Corky Wallet, in the comic strip Gasoline Alley
- Corky Withers, in the 1976 Goldman novel Magic
- Corky the Hornet, the mascot of the Emporia State University sports teams
- Corky, one of Jenny's friends in the Disney film Honey, We Shrunk Ourselves
- Corky, a parrot in the BBC soap opera EastEnders

== Other uses ==
- Corky (film), a 1972 stock car film starring Robert Blake
- Corky (orca) (born 1965), the longest living orca in captivity
- Alternative spelling of Corkey, a village in Northern Ireland
- Cricket ball, commonly referred to as a corky
- Charley horse, a leg cramp, called a corky in Australia
- Corky wine is a result of cork taint

== See also ==
- Korky
- Korky the Cat, a British comics character
- Corky's, a restaurant in Los Angeles
- Korki Buchek, fictional musician from the movie Borat
- Cokie Roberts, journalist and author
