= Korky =

Korky is a given name. Notable people with the name include:

- Korky Neufeld, Canadian politician
- Korky Paul (born 1951), British illustrator

== Fictional ==
- Korky the Cat

== See also ==
- Corky (disambiguation)
