= Corkie Blow =

English footballer

Personal information
- Full name: Edward Percy Blow
- Date of birth: 16 November 1877
- Place of birth: Lincoln, (Note: According to the Lincoln City FC Archive, Blow was born in North Hykeham, but census records list him as born in the St Botolph's parish of Lincoln. Both places lie in the Lincoln registration district, where his birth was registered.) England
- Date of death: 9 March 1938 (aged 60)
- Place of death: London, England
- Position: Left half

Senior career*
Years	Team	Apps	(Gls)
–	Blue Star (Lincoln)		
1901–1905	Lincoln City	162	(1)
–	Horncastle United		
–	Bracebridge		
- * Club domestic league appearances and goals

Edward Percy Blow (16 November 1877 – 9 March 1938), known as Percy, Corky, or Corkie Blow, was an English professional footballer who made 162 appearances in the Football League playing for Lincoln City. He also played non-League football in the Lincolnshire area. He played as a left half. While still a boy, he was honoured by the Royal Humane Society for saving the life of another child.

== Life and career ==
Blow was born in Lincoln, Lincolnshire, the second son of Thomas Blow, a wheelwright, and his wife Anna. As an 11-year-old, he received the Bronze Medal of the Royal Humane Society, "awarded to people who have put their own lives at great risk to save or attempt to save someone else", after an incident in Boultham, Lincoln, in January 1889. The Nottinghamshire Guardian reported that

The committee of the Royal Humane Society on Saturday announced the award of the bronze medal to Percy Blow, aged only 11 years, for having, on the 8th ult., and with the assistance of William Barton, saved the life of John Bray, aged six, at Boultham, Lincoln. The little fellow Bray, with an elder brother of nine, was crossing the river Witham on the ice, and when three-fourths of the way across the ice gave way, and both went in where the water was 8ft. deep. Blow and Barton, running to the rescue, the former stretched himself on the ice, Barton holding his hand from the bank, and was thus able to reach one of the drowning lads as he rose to the surface, and pulled him to the bank. The older boy was not recovered till too late.

The 1891 Census records the 13-year-old Blow living in Lincoln with his parents and six siblings and working in a skin yard alongside his brother Thomas, a year older.

The 23-year-old Blow had been working as a journeyman joiner and playing football for Lincoln team Blue Star when he joined his local professional club, Lincoln City. He made his senior debut in the last match of the 1900–01 Football League season, a 2–0 defeat away to Glossop in the Second Division. He became a regular member of the first team for the next five years; in April 1902, the Daily Express commented on how, despite the absence of Blow and fellow half-back Will Gibson, Lincoln "pressed continuously during the first half" and beat Bristol City 1–0. He scored just once in nationally organised competition, but did contribute the winning goal against Grimsby Town in the 1904 Lincolnshire Cup semi-final (Lincoln lost the final to Gainsborough Trinity). Blow's 180th and last appearance came in the penultimate game of the 1905–06 season, after which he returned to local non-League football.

Blow was married and had eight children. He died in London in 1938 at the age of 60.
