= Cork (surname) =

Cork is a surname.

People named Cork include:

- Alan Cork (born 1959), English footballer and coach
- Bruce Cork (died 1994), American physicist
- Dominic Cork (born 1971), English cricketer
- Jack Cork (born 1989), English footballer
- James M. Cork (1894–1957), American nuclear physicist
- Kenneth Cork (died 1991), English insolvency expert
- Richard John Cork (1917–1944), English fighter pilot
- Walter E. Cork (1886–1958), American politician and businessman

== See also ==
- Corke
