= Cork, Georgia =

Unincorporated community in Georgia, U.S.

Coordinates: 33°13′00″N 83°51′48″W

Cork is an unincorporated community in Butts County, in the U.S. state of Georgia.

== History ==
A variant name was "Dublin". The present name is after Cork, in Ireland, the native land of a large share of the early settlers.
