= Kork (surname) =

Kork is an Estonian surname. Notable people with the surname include:

- Andres Kork (born 1950), Estonian surgeon and politician
- August Kork (1887–1937), Estonian revolutionary and soldier
- Jüri Kork (born 1947), Estonian politician
- Karina Kork (born 1995), Estonian footballer
- Toomas Kork (born 1945), Estonian businessman and politician
