= Ronald Lake =

English cricketer

Ronald Dewé Lake (9 May 1891 – 28 July 1950) was an English cricketer active in 1922 who played for Northamptonshire (Northants). He was born in Bury St Edmunds and died in Winkton, Hampshire. He appeared in two first-class matches as a righthanded batsman who scored 48 runs with a highest score of 30.
