= KORK =

KORK may refer to:

== Media ==
- KORK-CD, a low-power television station (channel 35) licensed to Portland, Oregon, United States
- KSNV, a television station (channel 3 analog/2 digital) licensed to Las Vegas, Nevada, United States, which used the call sign KORK-TV prior to 1980
- KRLV (AM), a radio station licensed to Las Vegas, Nevada, United States, which used the call sign KORK prior to 1997
- KXPT, a radio station licensed to Las Vegas, Nevada, United States, which used the call sign KORK-FM prior to 1983

== Music ==
- The Norwegian Radio Orchestra, called Kringkastingsorkestret in Norwegian, and commonly known by the acronym KORK

== Places ==
- The ICAO airport code for North Little Rock Municipal Airport in North Little Rock, Arkansas, United States

== See also ==
- Kork (disambiguation)
