= Corky's =

Coordinates: 34.16244°N 118.448989°W

Corky's Restaurant and The Cork Lounge
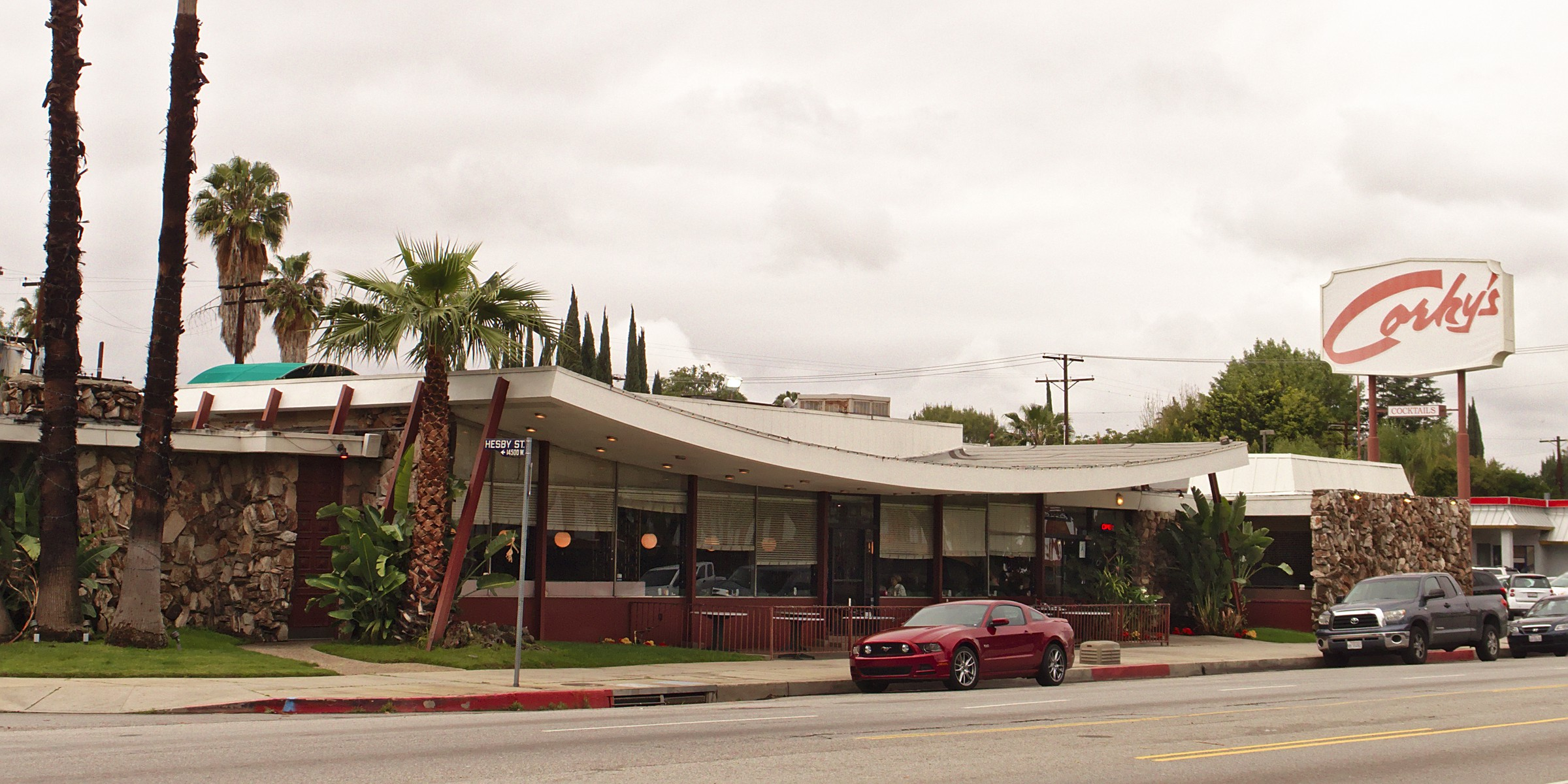
- The restaurant in 2014
- Interactive map of Corky's Restaurant and The Cork Lounge

Restaurant information
- Established: 1958
- Closed: 2019
- Location: 5043 Van Nuys Blvd, Sherman Oaks, California, 91403, United States

Corky's was a restaurant that operated in the Sherman Oaks neighborhood of Los Angeles, California, from 1958 to 2019.

It originally opened as Stanley Burke's Coffee Shop in 1958. The building was designed by Armet & Davis and was built with a sweeping roofline characteristic of Googie architecture. Helen Liu Fong designed the interior.

It was renamed Corky's in 1964 and transitioned to being open 24 hours. It was remodeled in the 1970s. Billy Joel played piano at the eatery in the early 1970s but was fired after only a few weeks. In 1980, it became The Lamplighter, and was used as a location for the 2010 film A Nightmare on Elm Street. The restaurant was restored and renovated in 2010 and changed its name back to Corky's. Corky’s closed on December 14, 2019, and the interior was later demolished.

The building was declared a Los Angeles Historic-Cultural Monument in 2020. By 2025, the vacant building had fallen into disrepair and was frequently vandalized. In 2025, plans were announced for Chick-fil-A to open a restaurant there and restore the property based on its original 1950s appearance and Fong's interior design. It reopened as a Chick-fil-A on December 4, 2025.
