= Wich Stand =

Coordinates: 33.9886°N 118.3545°W

- Interactive map of the Wich Stand area

General information
- Architectural style: Googie architecture
- Location: Los Angeles
- Completed: 1957

Design and construction
- Architect: Eldon Davis

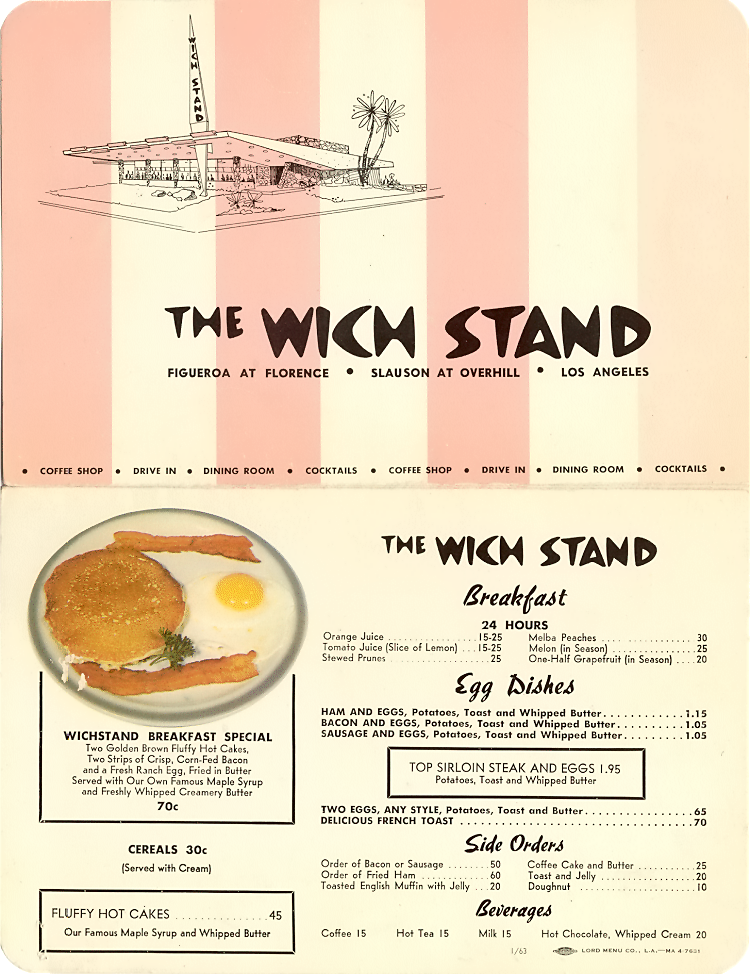
Restaurant Menu from early 1960s with illustration of Slauson Ave location

Wich Stand was a '50s-style coffee shop restaurant and diner in Los Angeles, California, featuring a tilting blue roof and 35-foot spire (11 m), designed by architect Eldon Davis.

The Wich Stand had two locations in the Los Angeles area. One of the buildings still exists at the intersection of Slauson Avenue and Overhill Drive in View Park-Windsor Hills, an unincorporated affluent neighborhood of Los Angeles County near the city of Inglewood that is encircled. It was known for its dart neon sign.

A food critic said its "plunging dart of a sign keeps it from spinning off into space," and it's a surviving preserved examples of Googie architecture, according to The Los Angeles Times.

The other was located within City of Los Angeles proper at the Northwest corner of Figueroa Street and Florence Avenue (as listed on menu and matchbook cover), which preceded the one "on the hill."

== The Beach Boys ==
The Beach Boys lived in the area and wrote an unreleased song called "Wich Stand". The coffee shop also inspired another Beach Boys song, "Root Beer (Chug-a-Lug)", about "Cruisin' the A," which was driving the five miles between the A & W on Hawthorne Boulevard and the Wich Stand on Slauson.

== Simply Wholesome ==
Simply Wholesome
- Interactive map of Simply Wholesome

Restaurant information
- Established: 1995; 31 years ago in Los Angeles, California, United States
- Owner: Parcell Keeling
- Food type: Health food
- Location: 4508 W Slauson Avenue, Los Angeles, Los Angeles, California, United States
- Other information: The building is one of the best preserved examples of Davis' Googie designs
- Website: Simply Wholesome.com

The Slauson Avenue location opened in 1957. It fell upon hard times in the early 1980s and was vandalized. The floors and ceilings were gutted after the diner closed in 1988. In 1989 it was declared a historic landmark by the Los Angeles County. In 1995 the building was completely refurbished and reopened as Simply Wholesome vegan restaurant and health food store.

== See also ==
- Beach Boys Historic Landmark, childhood home location in Hawthorne
