= Holiday Bowl (building) =

Bowling alley on Crenshaw Boulevard in Los Angeles, California

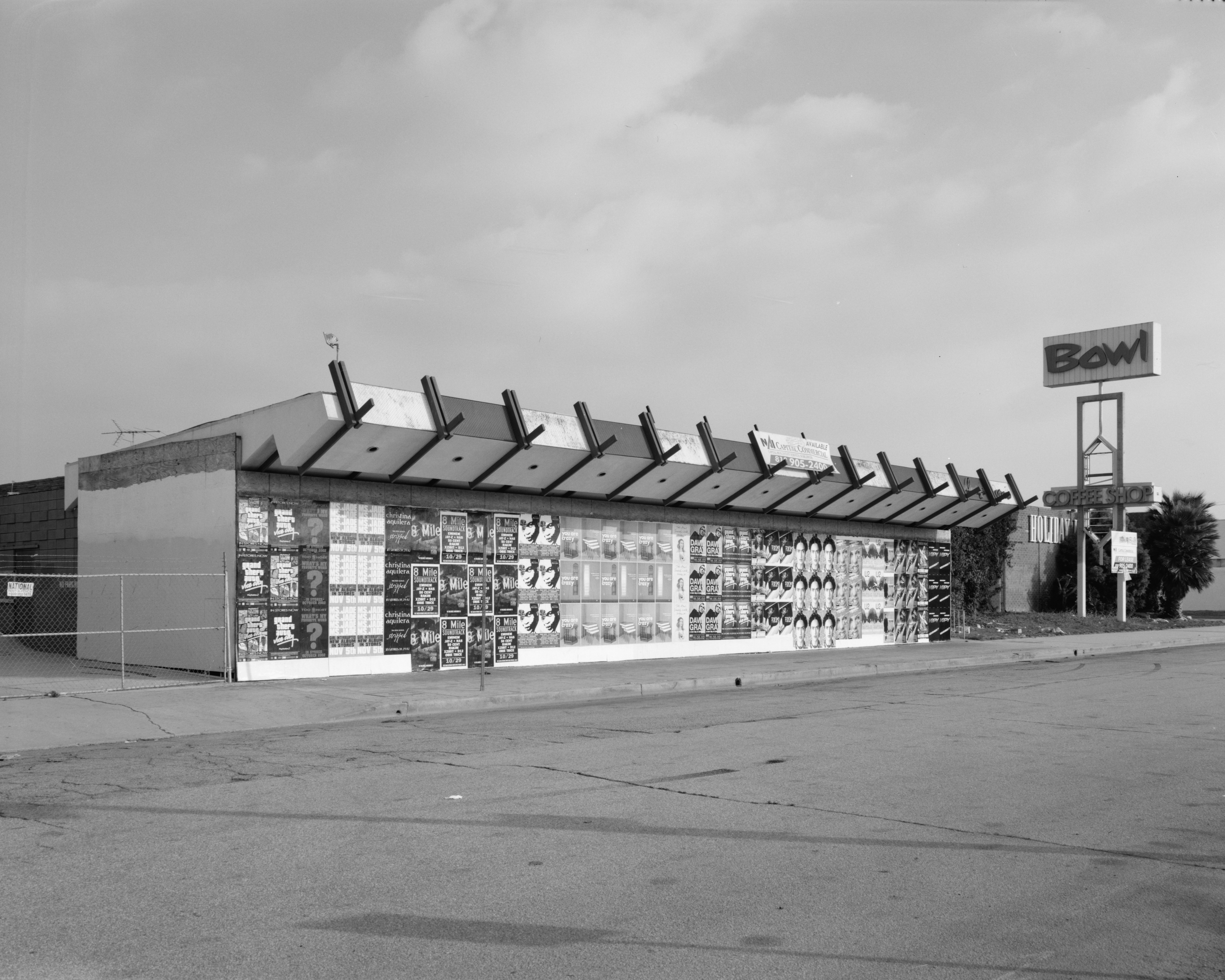
- Holiday Bowl in 2002
- Interactive map of the Holiday Bowl area

General information
- Architectural style: Googie
- Location: 3730 Crenshaw Blvd., Los Angeles, California, United States
- Coordinates: 34.0191°N 118.3346°W
- Current tenants: Starbucks, Walgreens
- Construction started: 1958

Technical details
- Floor count: 1

Design and construction
- Architect: Helen Liu Fong
- Architecture firm: Armet & Davis

The Holiday Bowl was a bowling alley on Crenshaw Boulevard in Los Angeles, California. It was founded in 1958 by five Japanese-Americans and was a significant part of the rebuilding process of the Nikkei community after internment during World War II. The owners of the Holiday Bowl sold shares throughout the community to finance its construction."

== Cultural significance ==
Located on Crenshaw Boulevard, the Holiday Bowl was important in the desegregation of Los Angeles and served an Anglo American, African American, and Japanese American clientele. The coffee shop served grits, udon, chow mein, and hamburgers. The Bowl operated for four decades and was a cultural, architectural, and recreational feature for the Crenshaw business district "as the Hollywood Bowl has for the Hollywood Hills".

== History ==
The Bowl was built by Japanese entrepreneurs as a combination bowling alley, pool hall, bar and coffee shop in 1958 and served Crenshaw's Japanese residents who "had not long before suffered Manzanar's internment camps and a blanket racial ban by the American Bowling Congress." A Los Angeles Times Magazine story noted: "Once haunted at 4 a.m. by swing-shift aerospace workers and nighthawk Central Avenue jazz musicians, the Holiday Bowl, like Leimert Park to its south, remains a concrete expression of community in an era when the whole notion of community has been raised to the level of abstraction." A 1999 LA Weekly story said, "Holiday speaks of Crenshaw’s bright, enduring middle-class dreams, with its ’50s-inspired orange-and-green décor and giant plate-glass window that affords a grand view of Baldwin Hills to the south. Eat your grits and eat your heart out." The article also states that the ownership of the Bowl changed hands several times and offered "a huge cross section of ethnic dishes: Japanese (harusame, yakisoba, donburi), Chinese (a vast assortment of chow mein, pork noodles, foo young, saifun) and black Southern (hot links, grits, salmon patties, short ribs, biscuits and gravy)."

The owner said he took pride in Holiday's staying power, in its history, and the fact that it was designed by Armet & Davis, "the architectural firm that popularized Googie-style coffee shops and turned diners like Holiday and the nearby Wich Stand into zig-zaggy emblems of L.A. optimism." He said the building was not damaged during the 1992 Los Angeles riots and that people bowled that night.

== Architecture ==
The Holiday Bowl is considered an example of Googie architecture and was designed by the Armet & Davis architectural firm. The firm is said to have "defined '50s Googie architecture". Helen Liu Fong was the designer at Armet & Davis who is credited with designing the Holiday Bowl.

The Bowl was photographed in stereo for 3-D viewing by Jack Laxer.

== Closure ==
The Bowl closed in 2000 and was targeted for demolition. Bowl supporters mobilized, persuading the City of Los Angeles's Cultural Heritage Commission to designate the structure an historical-cultural monument. It is listed as number 688 on the City of Los Angeles Historic Cultural Monument list.

== Revitalization ==
The former bowling alley front area was refurbished in October 2004 and replaced with a modern outdoor shopping center anchored by Walgreens that opened to the public in early 2006. The former Coffee Shop had become a Starbucks Coffee and other restaurants from the former alley such as Denny's. The neon signs from a nearby former Honda/Majestic Pontiac car dealership had been upgraded with new LED lighting. Preservationists wanted the landmark saved for its history, cultural significance, and architectural history.
