= Eldon Davis =

American architect

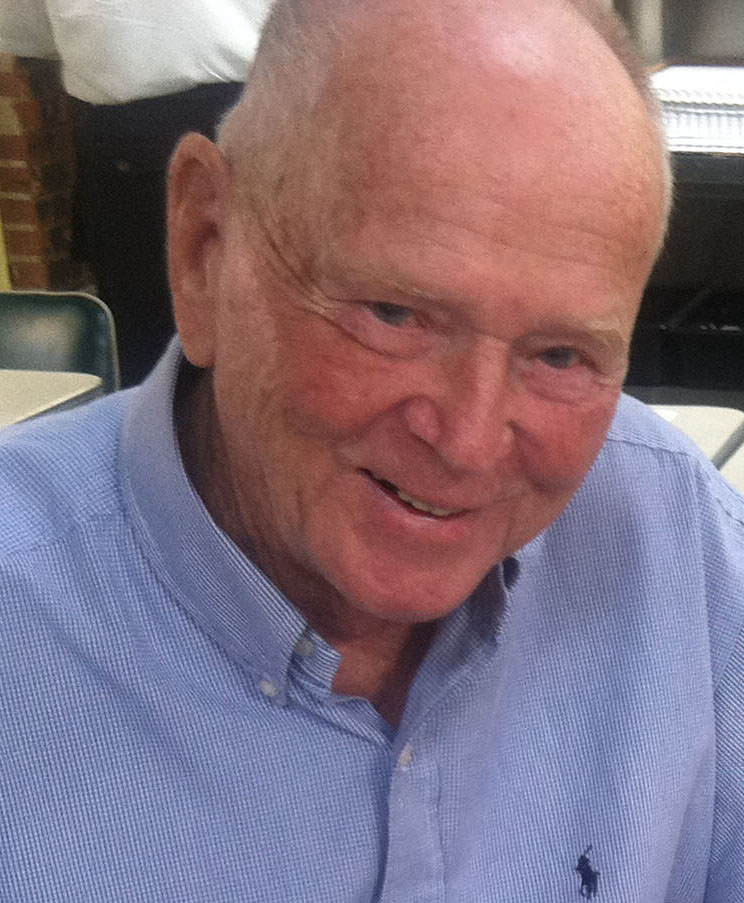
- Born: February 2, 1917; Anacortes, Washington; United States
- Died: April 22, 2011 (aged 94); West Hills, California; United States
- Education: University of Southern California
- Occupation: Architect
- Practice: Armet & Davis
- Buildings: Norms Restaurants; Pann's Restaurant; Wich Stand

Eldon Carlyle Davis (February 2, 1917 – April 22, 2011) was an American architect, considered largely responsible for the creation of Googie architecture, a form of modern architecture originating in Southern California. Googie architecture is largely influenced by Southern California's car culture and the Space Age of the mid-20th century. Davis was a founding partner of the Armet & Davis architectural firm which championed Googie architecture, including the original Norms Restaurant, a Googie coffee shop designed by Davis. For his work, the Los Angeles Times called Davis, "the father of the California coffee shop."

== Biography ==
Eldon Davis was born in Anacortes, Washington in 1917. He originally worked at a fish cannery while attending the University of Southern California. He created a new design for the fish cannery as an architectural student, a design that was later built. Davis earned a bachelor's degree in architecture from the University of Southern California in 1942.

Davis and his business partner, architect Louis Armet, expected to work in industrial architecture following their graduation from USC. However, their plans changed thanks to the post-war construction boom in Southern California following World War II. They began designing structures geared towards a growing population, including nurseries, churches, country clubs, banks and even bowling alleys.

In 1947, Davis and Armet opened their architectural firm, Armet & Davis. Together, the architects used their firm and its designs to champion Googie architecture, especially in California. The firm exists today as Armet Davis Newlove Architecture and is headquartered in Santa Monica, California.

One of the best preserved examples of Davis's work is the Pann's coffee shop and its neon sign in Westchester, Los Angeles. Davis also designed the early prototypes for local Big Boy and Denny's restaurants in Los Angeles. The older buildings on the Fullerton campus of Hope International University also display Davis's classic Googie style.

Eldon Davis died of complications from spinal meningitis, at a hospital in West Hills, Los Angeles, on April 22, 2011, at the age of 94. He was survived by his second wife, Luana; a daughter, Karen; three sons, Dan, Mark and Wyatt; five grandchildren, Robin, Cindy, Ryan, Eric, and Marisa; and two great-grandchildren, Audrey and Connor. His first wife of more than thirty years died in the 1970s.
