= Louis Armet =

American architect

Louis Armét
- Born: October 26, 1914; St. Louis, Missouri; United States
- Died: October 11, 1981 (aged 66); Los Angeles, California; United States
- Education: University of Southern California
- Occupation: Architect
- Practice: Armét & Davis

Louis Logue Armét (/ɑːrˈmeɪ/ ar-MAY; October 26, 1914 – October 11, 1981) was an American architect and strong proponent of Googie architecture during the mid-twentieth century.

== Biography ==
Born in St. Louis, Missouri, Armét moved to Los Angeles, California at the age of thirteen, where he attended Los Angeles High School, Loyola University, and the USC School of Architecture. From 1941 to 1943, he worked for the Navy Department of Design at Pearl Harbor, followed by a three-year hitch with the Seabees.

Armét received his architect license in 1946. He co-founded the Armét & Davis architectural firm with Eldon Davis in 1947, which became known for its distinctive Googie architecture style in Southern California.

Armét died in Los Angeles at the age of 66.
