= Norms Restaurants =

Southern California restaurant chain

- The horizontal version of the logo

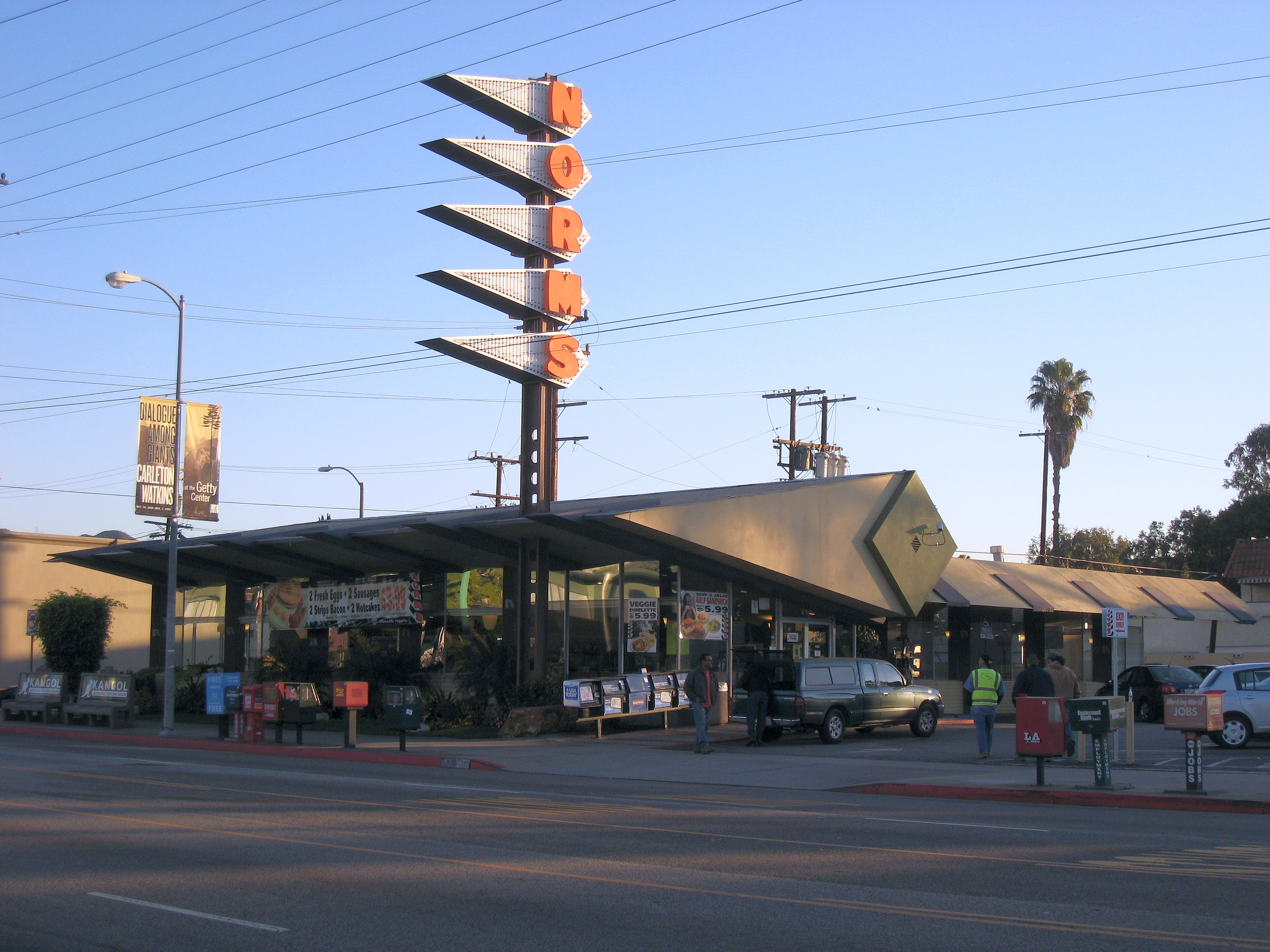
- Norms location at 470 N. La Cienega Blvd
- Industry: Restaurant
- Founded: 1949; 77 years ago in Los Angeles, California, United States
- Founder: Norm Roybark
- Headquarters: Bellflower, California
- Number of locations: 24
- Area served: Greater Los Angeles, Las Vegas
- Owner: Norms Restaurants, LLC
- Website: norms.com

Norms Restaurants (stylized as NORMS) is a regional chain of diner-style restaurants founded in 1949 by used-car salesman Norm Roybark. As of 2026, the company operates 23 locations in Greater Los Angeles, and in 2024 it opened one in Las Vegas. Some restaurants are open 24 hours a day, 7 days a week.

== History ==
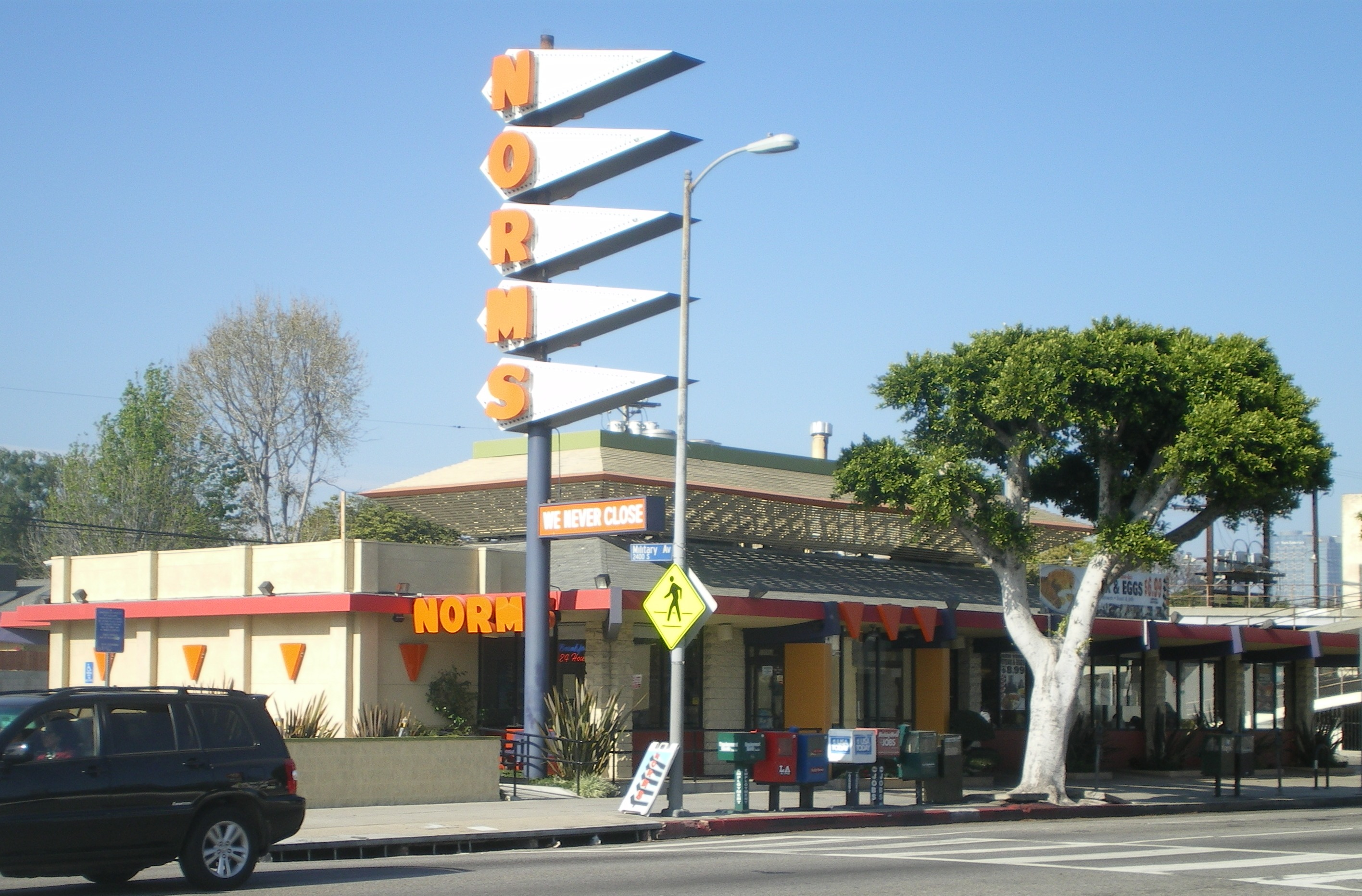
Norms in West Los Angeles in 2008 (since demolished)

The first Norms opened on Sunset Boulevard near Vine Street in 1949. The oldest surviving Norms, declared Los Angeles Historic-Cultural Monument number 1090 in 2015, opened on La Cienega Boulevard in 1957, featuring a distinctive angular and brightly colored style that came to be known as Googie architecture. Key characteristics include angular walls, large glass windows, jutting roof, and a neon marquee. Many Norms restaurants, including the 1957 La Cienega Boulevard location, were designed by the architectural firm of Armét & Davis to look like automobile showrooms. Their appearance has made them the subject of exhibitions curated by the Getty Center.

In December 2014, the Roybark family sold the family-owned Bellflower-based chain, but not the land each restaurant sits on, to an investment firm, CapitalSpring, for an undisclosed amount. "We cut across everything", Mike Colonna, the new president of Norms said in 2019. "We have the blue collar workers, white collar workers with ties getting a quick lunch, ethnic diversity at every table. We get late-night millennials, and our base of baby boomers. We're kind of retro cool and we think the Googie architecture is a big part of the brand." When the real estate under the La Cienega store was sold, Colonna reassured customers that the business would stay. "Norms has committed to the location long term", Colonna told Los Angeles magazine. "We have an agreement with the landlord and plan to be in business for quite some time."

The Norms restaurant on Pico in West Los Angeles was forced to close on Christmas Eve 2016 because the new landlords refused to renew the lease and had other unspecified plans for the real estate. County assessor records showed that the Roybark family had sold the land in April 2015 for $8.25 million.

In mid-2024, the company opened its first location outside of Greater Los Angeles, in Las Vegas.

== In popular culture ==
- Depicted in the 1964 painting "Norms La Cienega on Fire" by Edward Ruscha
- In the 2015 film Woman in Gold starring Helen Mirren, the interior and exterior of a since-demolished Norms Restaurant on West Pico Boulevard in West Los Angeles was used.
- Featured in Jerry Seinfeld's Comedians in Cars Getting Coffee episode with Mel Brooks and Carl Reiner "I Want Sandwiches, I Want Chicken"
- In the 2025 film One of Them Days, Dreux, played by Keke Palmer, is a server at Norms who hopes to manage a franchise location.
- A fictional Norms restaurant plays a central role in the 2025 film Good Luck, Have Fun, Don't Die, as the location where the time-traveling lead tries to recruit diners to save the world from a rogue AI. The diner was recreated in South Africa, where the film was shot.
