= Midgaard (Marquette, Michigan) =

- U.S. National Register of Historic Places
- Location within Michigan Location within the United States
- Interactive map
- Location: Middle Island Point, Marquette, Michigan
- Coordinates: 46°35′30″N 87°24′30″W
- Area: 1.2 acres (0.49 ha)
- Built: 1926
- Built by: John Lautner Sr. and John Lautner Jr.
- Architect: John E. and Vida Lautner
- NRHP reference No.: 13000444
- Added to NRHP: June 25, 2013

Midgaard, also known as the Lautner Cottage, is a chalet style log cabin located on Middle Island Point, near Marquette, Michigan. It is significant as the first building that then-12-year-old John Lautner (later an influential American architect) helped construct. Midgaard was listed on the National Register of Historic Places in 2013.

== History ==
John E. Lautner Sr. was born in 1865 in Greilickville, Michigan, to parents who had recently immigrated from Austria. Lautner attended the University of Michigan, graduating in 1893 and continuing studies in Europe. In 1903, he accepted a position as a professor of languages and sociology at Northern State Normal School (now Northern Michigan University) in Marquette. In 1907, Lautner married Vida Cathleen Gallagher, the daughter of Irish immigrants and one of his students at Northern. The couple had two children: John Lautner Jr (later an influential architect), born in 1911, and Kathleen Lautner, born in 1915.

In 1912, John and Vida Lautner built a wood framed New England saltbox-style house in Marquette, based on a design jointly developed by Vida Launter and New Jersey architect Joy Wheeler Dow. They dubbed the house "Keepsake." In the early 1920s, the Lautners began to be interested in building a summer cottage on Middle Island Point, and in 1921 they bought four shares in the Middle Island Point Campers' Association. Over the next two years, the Lautners planned the construction and decor of the cottage, being heavily influenced by Norwegian folk architecture guides.

The Lautners chose a prominent cliff overlooking Lake Superior on which to position their cabin. They began construction in 1923, using spruce logs cut nearby and skidded up the incline. The construction was done primarily by John Lautner and his son, John Lautner, Jr., with occasional help from some of Lautner's students. John Jr.'s early experience with construction and design of the Midgaard cabin heavily influenced his understanding of craftmanship and later architectural work. Construction stretched over several years, and was completed in 1927.

The following year, Vida Lautner wrote articles about Midgaard, which were featured in Progressive Education and Home Building,; the chalet was also featured in Marquette's local newspaper. The Lautners continued to own the cottage for many years. John Lautner Sr. died in 1943, after which Vida Lautner moved to Chicago. However, both Vida and John Lautner Jr. visited multiple times, up to her death in 1978 and his in 1994. John Lautner Jr. replaced the roof in 1932, and constructed a terrace on the north side (facing the lake) in 1939. Two balconies originally on the north and south sides were demolished in the 1980s due to structural deterioration and were never replaced. It was John Lautner Sr.'s wish that the cabin remain in the family "ad infinitum", and it is still owned by his descendants.

== John Lautner Jr. ==
John Lautner Jr. went on to become an influential architect, and frequently noted that his interest in construction and architecture began with his involvement in the construction of Midgaard. He studied in Frank Lloyd Wright's apprenticeship program at Taliesin from 1933 to 1938, then struck out on his own in southern California. However, his career didn't blossom until after World War II. His work mainly focused on residential architecture, creating distinctly personal designs that took into consideration materials, the site location, and the preferences of his client. The residences also incorporated the surrounding environment into the look and feel of the structure.

Many of Lautner's residences were constructed on the steep hillsides surrounding Los Angeles. Perhaps the best known is "Chemosphere," an octagonal house which the Encyclopædia Britannica once called "the most modern home built in the world." Lautner received the Architectural Record Award for Excellence in 1971 and 1977 and a Cody Award in 1980; he was named Olympic Architect in 1984, and in 1993 received a Gold Medal from the AIA chapter of Los Angeles, CA.

== Description ==
Midgaard is a front-gabled, two-story log cabin with a low pitched roof, situated on a rocky promontory above Lake Superior. The cabin is reached from the main road by a winding, unpaved footpath. A terrace is built against the house on the main (north) facade facing the lake.

The cabin is constructed from spruce logs interspersed with chinking sitting on a rubble fieldstone and granite rock foundation. The roof is covered with asphalt shingling, with eaves overhanging the cabin walls below. All windows are triple casement, with the center window hinged.

The north and south facades are nearly identical, with a central door on the first floor flanked by windows, and a similar arrangement on the second floor. The second floor overhangs by the width of one log, and there is currently no balcony for the second-story door to access. On the east and west sides, the second floor overhangs by about two feet There are two windows on the west facade, one above each other on the north end. The east facade is similar, with an additional third window on the first floor toward the south.

Inside, the cabin is sectioned into two main rooms, with a larger living room and dining area to the north and a smaller kitchen and bathroom to the south. The central section of the cabin is open from the floor to the roof. A corner staircase accesses the second-story balcony, which runs around the perimeter of the cabin. A brick fireplace, designed by John Lautner Sr., is in one corner.

The interior of the cabin contains furnishings designed in a Scandinavian peasant style, with colorfully painted chests and antiques. Textiles included curtains block printed by Vida Lautner to simulate Swedish weavings, striped rag rugs, and decorative embroideries on the walls.
