= Atomic Age (design) =

Design style from the approximate period 1945–1970

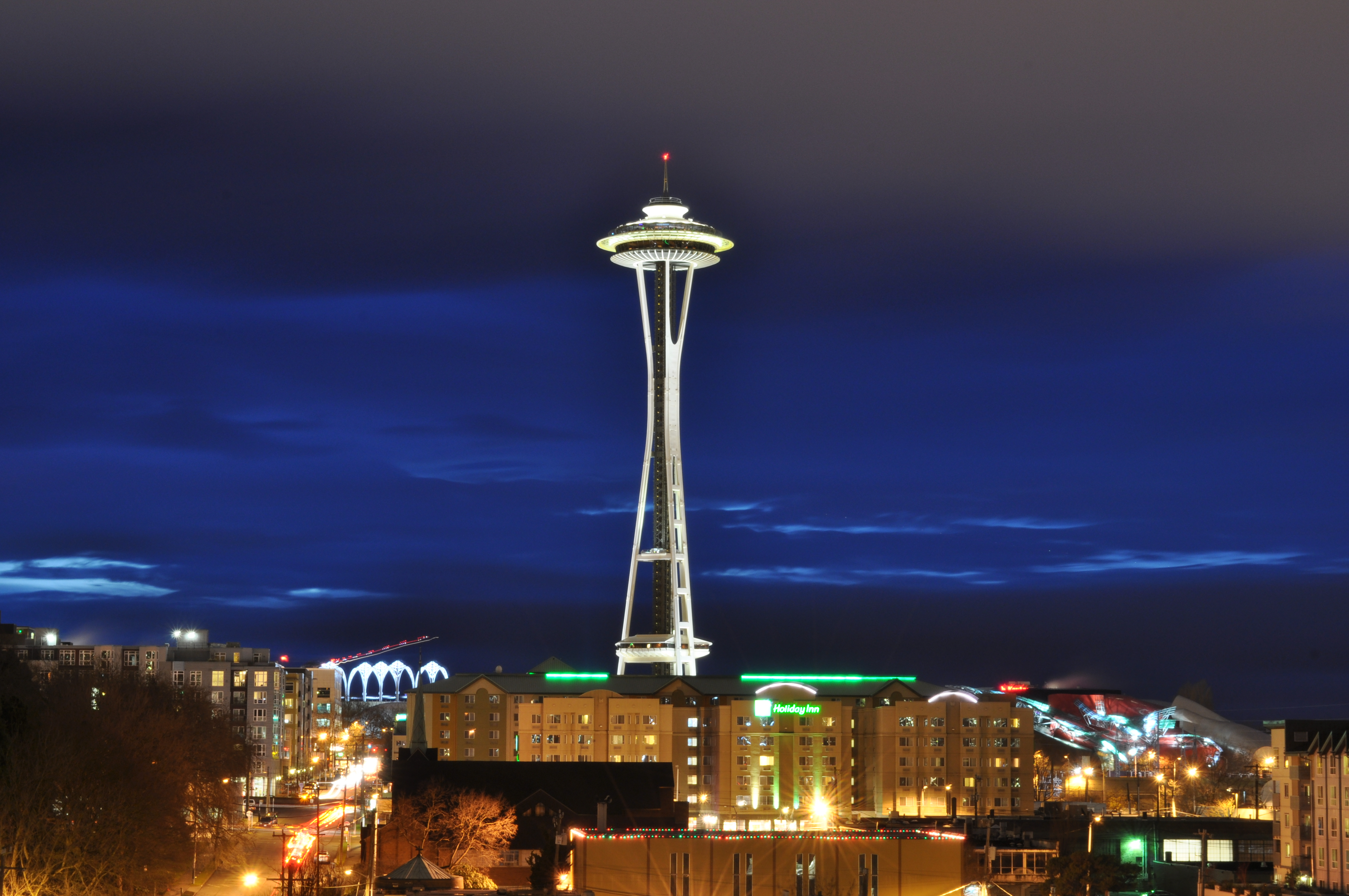
The Seattle, Washington Space Needle, built in 1962. Atomic Age design included elements of space exploration, scientific discovery, and futurism.

In design, the Atomic Age is the period from roughly 1945 to 1967, when concerns about nuclear war dominated Western society during the Cold War. Architecture, industrial design, commercial design (including advertising), interior design, and fine arts were all influenced by the themes of atomic science, as well as the Space Age, which coincided with that period. Atomic Age design became popular and instantly recognizable, with a use of atomic motifs and space age symbols.

== Vital forms ==
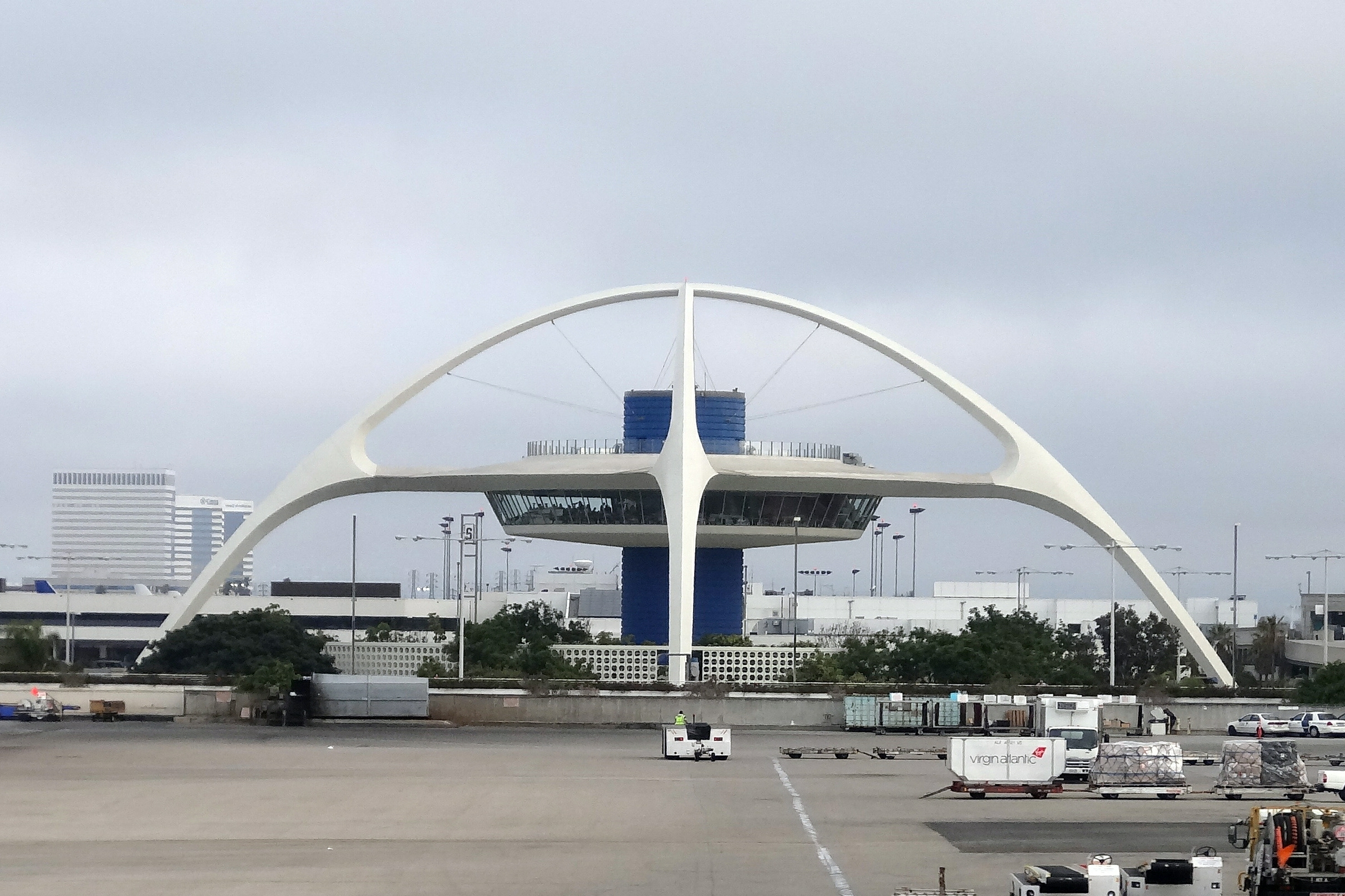
Theme Building in Los Angeles International Airport

Abstract organic forms were identified as a core motif in the 2001 exhibition of Atomic Age design at the Brooklyn Museum of Art, titled "Vital forms: American art and design in the atomic age, 1940–1960". Atomic power was a paradox during the era. It held great promise of technological solutions for the problems facing an increasingly complex world; At the same time, people were fearful of a nuclear armageddon, after the use of atomic weapons at the end of World War II. People were ever-aware of the potential good, and lurking menace, in technology. Science became more visible in the mainstream culture through Atomic Age design.

Atomic particles themselves were reproduced in visual design, in areas ranging from architecture to barkcloth patterns. The geometric atomic patterns that were produced in textiles, industrial materials, melamine counter tops, dishware and wallpaper, and many other items, are emblematic of Atomic Age design. The Space Age interests of the public also began showing up in Atomic Age designs, with star and galaxy motifs appearing alongside the atomic graphics.

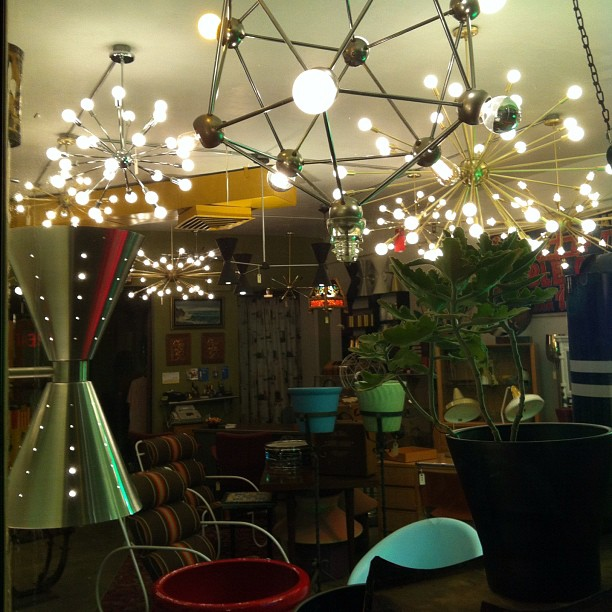
Vintage atom and molecule-shaped ceiling light fixtures

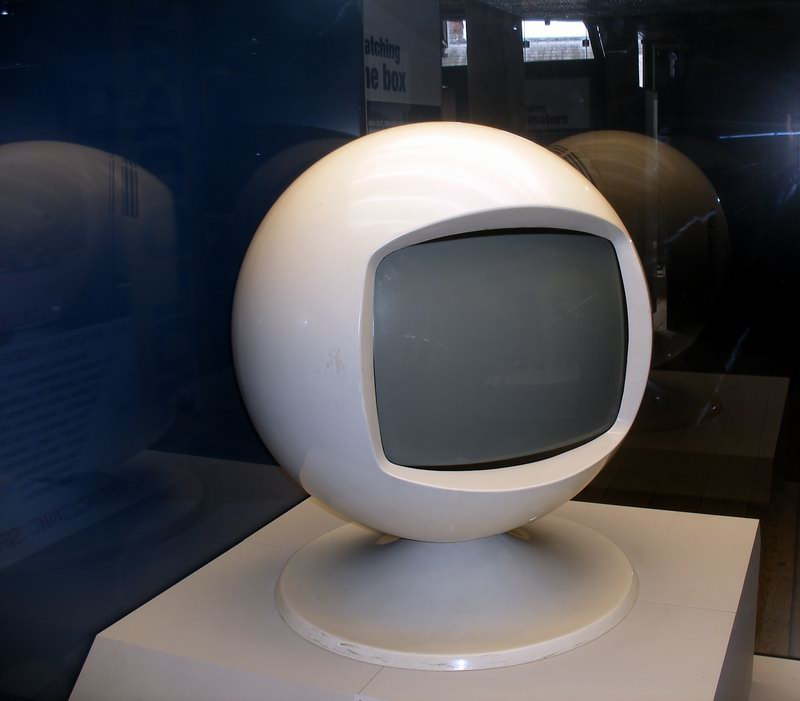
The futuristic-looking Keracolor Sphere television

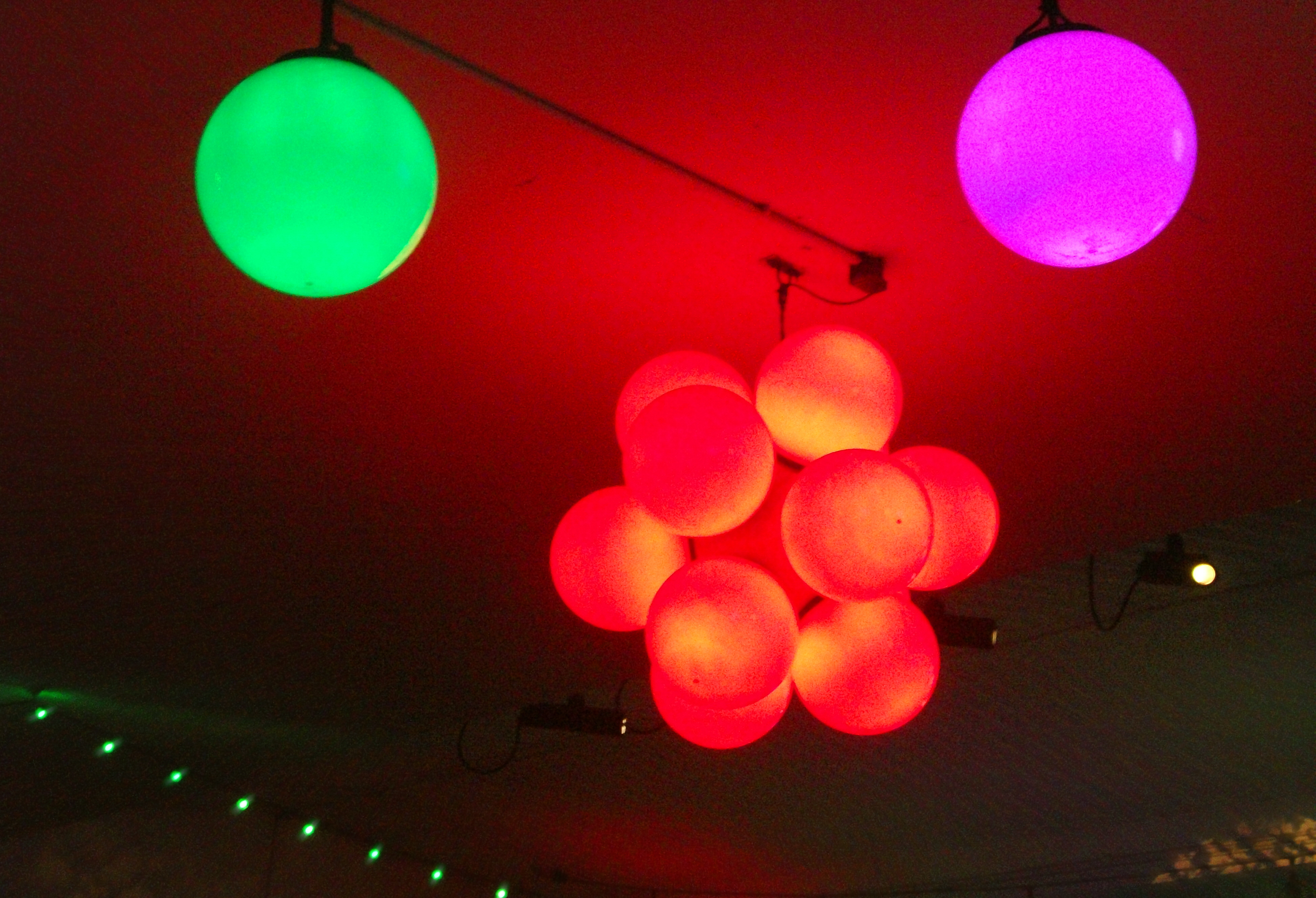
An atom-shaped ceiling light fixture

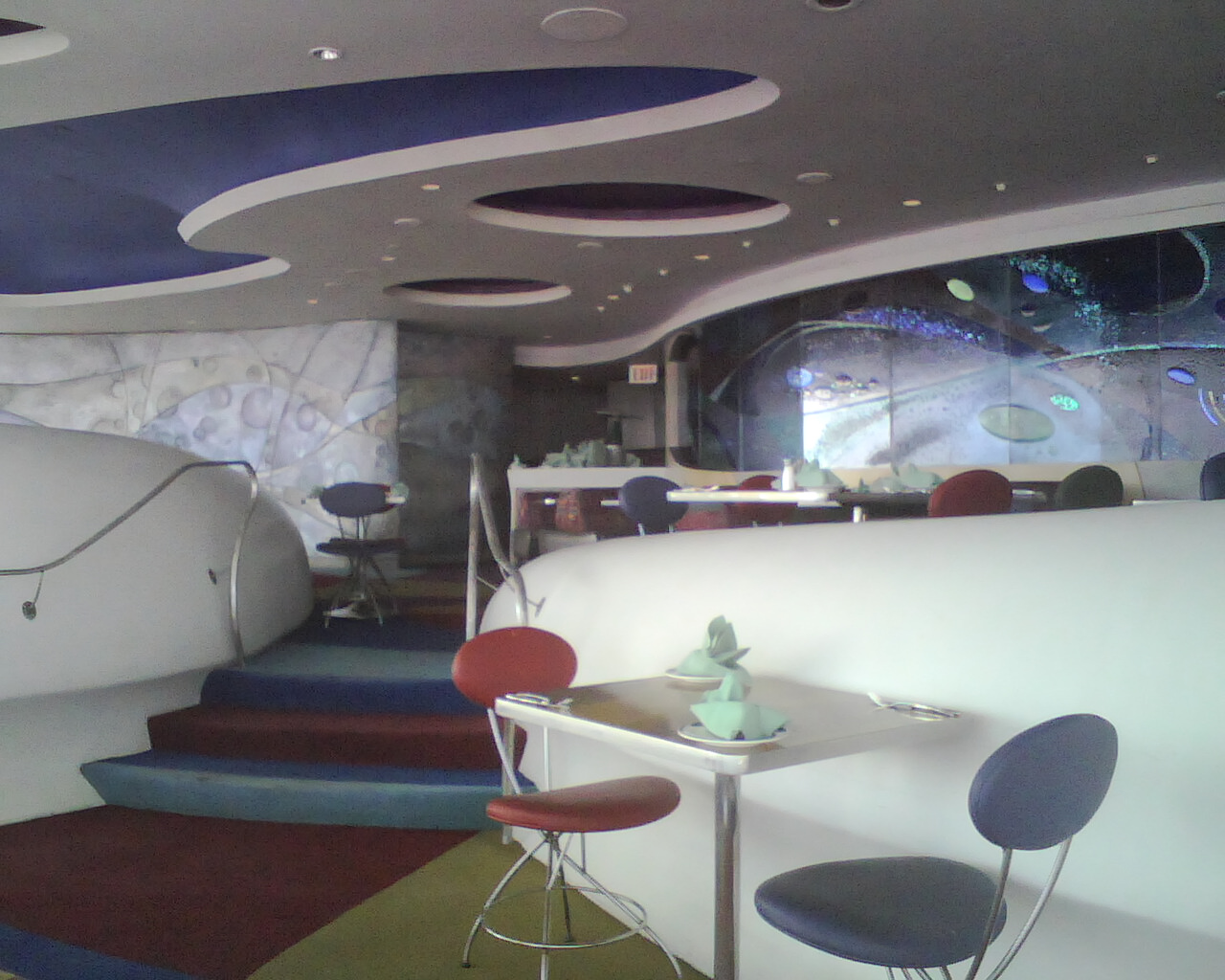
Los Angeles International Airport's "Inside Encounter" lounge in its space age Theme Building

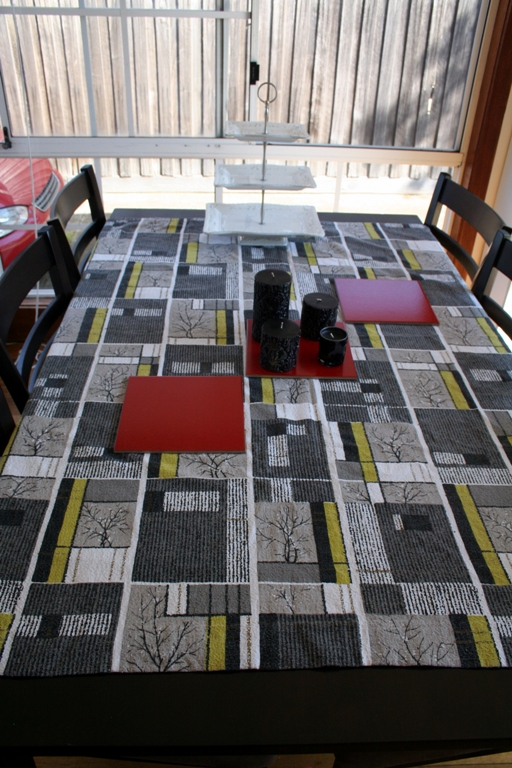
1950s barkcloth tablecloth with a geometric design and a botanical motif

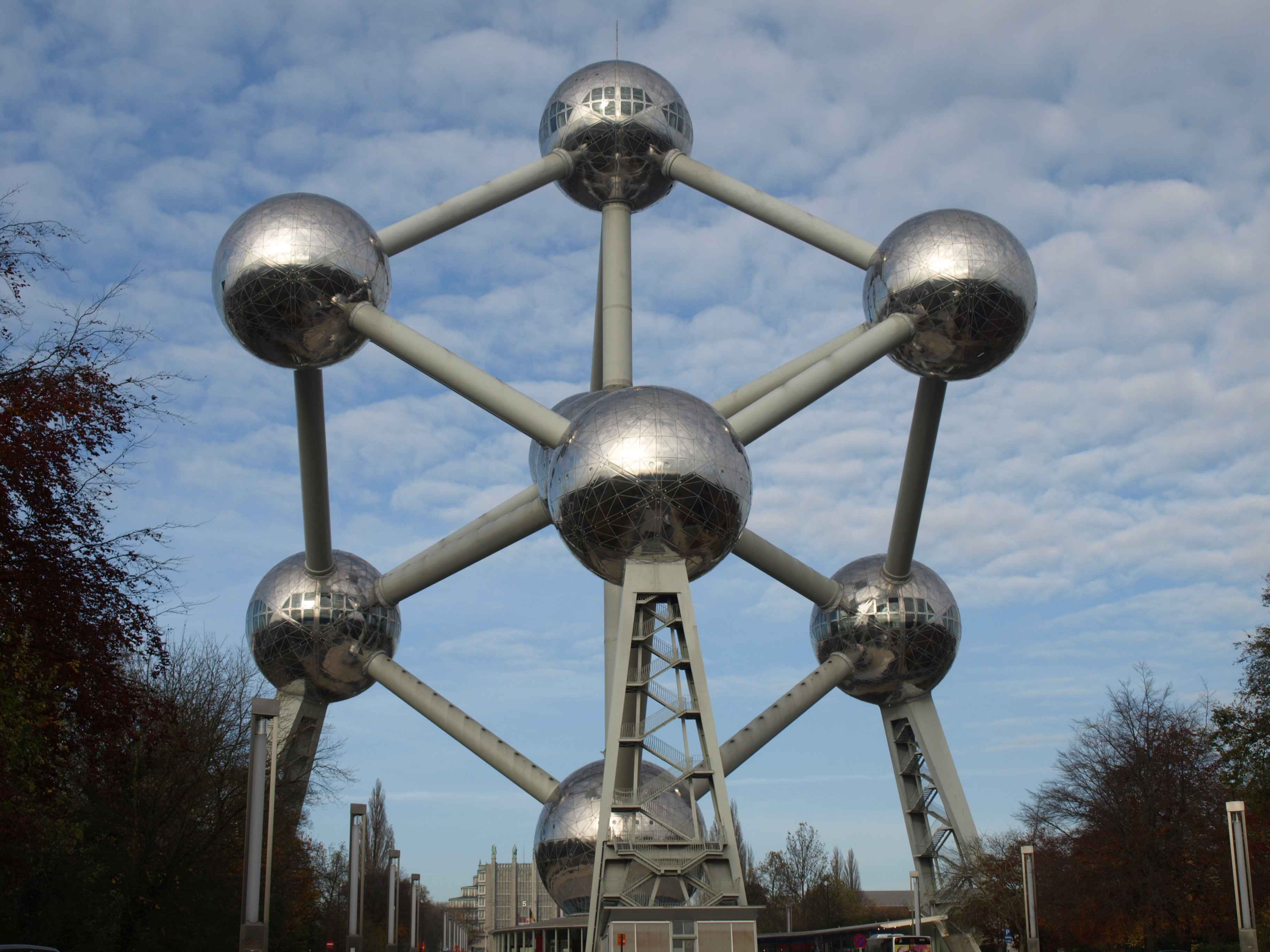
Brussels Atomium (1958)

=== Starburst Motif ===
The atomic starburst became one of the most recognizable and ubiquitous symbols of Atomic Age design. This radiating pattern, characterized by lines or spokes extending from a central point often tipped with spheres or points, visually represented atomic particles and energy while evoking the optimism of the era. The motif appeared across virtually every category of design, from architecture to household goods.

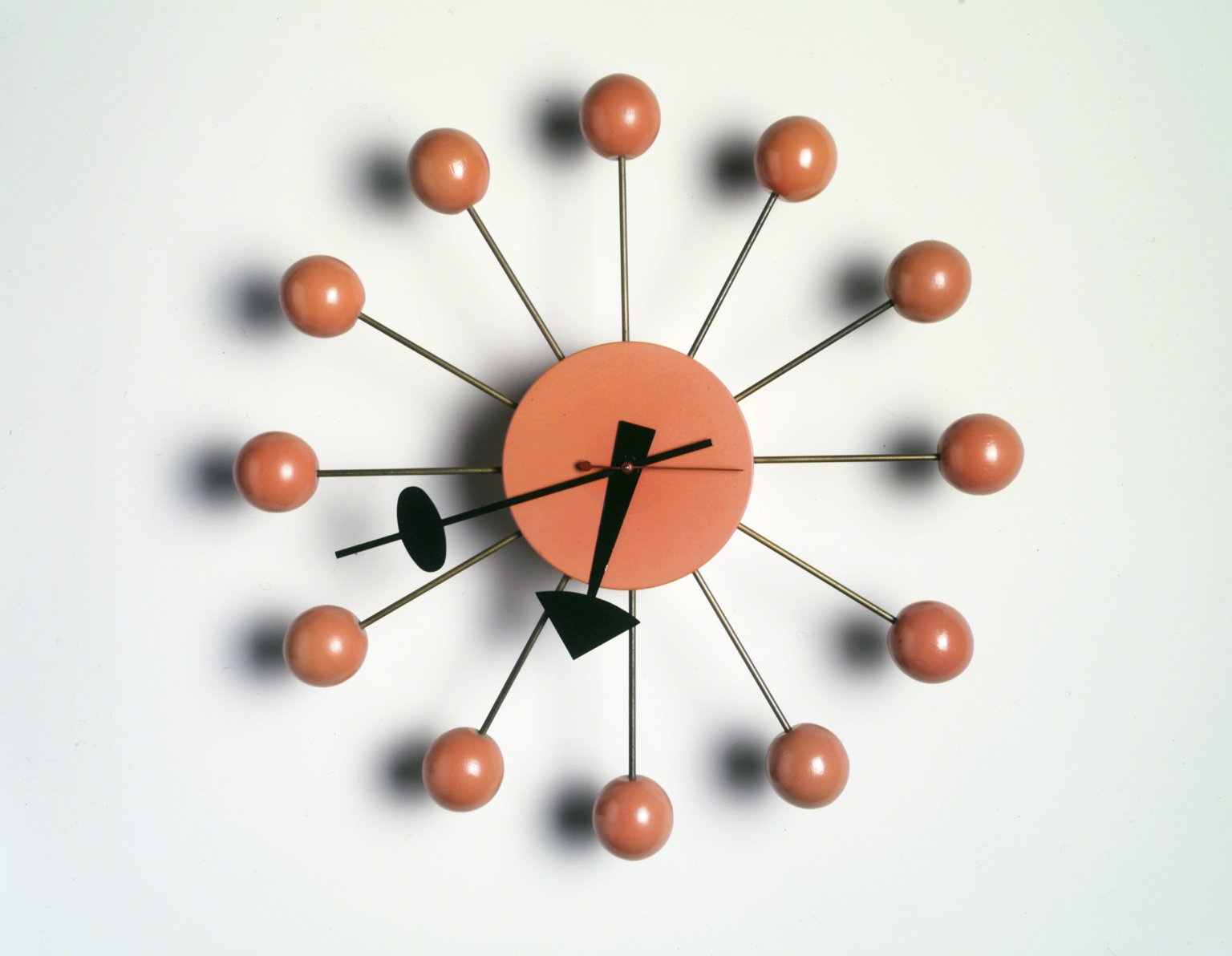
"Ball Wall Clock" by George Nelson and Irving Harper, 1948

George Nelson's Ball Clock, designed in collaboration with Irving Harper in 1947 and released by the Howard Miller Clock Company in 1949, became an iconic early example of the starburst aesthetic. The clock's distinctive design featured brass rods radiating from a central timepiece, each tipped with colorful wooden balls, directly mimicking the ball-and-stick models of atoms used by physicists. The numberless design reinforced Nelson's philosophy that clocks had become decorative objects rather than purely functional timekeepers, and the atomic imagery made it an instant symbol of the postwar Atomic Age.

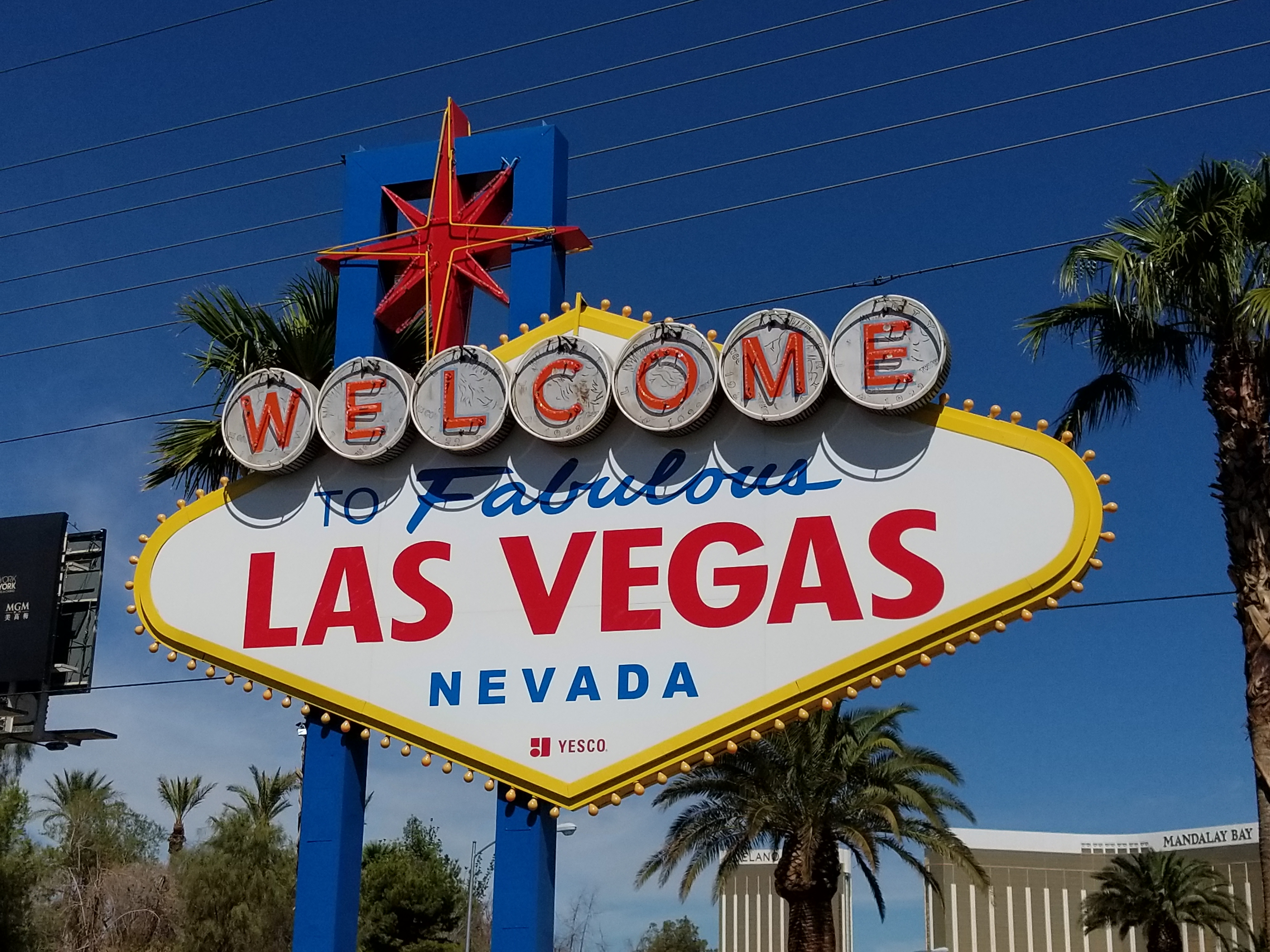
The "Welcome to Fabulous Las Vegas" sign features an eight pointed starburst

The starburst motif found particularly widespread adoption in commercial and architectural signage. Betty Willis's 1959 design for the Welcome to Fabulous Las Vegas sign exemplifies this trend, with its prominent eight-pointed star crowning the diamond-shaped structure. The sign, which has become one of the most photographed landmarks in the United States and was added to the National Register of Historic Places in 2009, represents the fusion of Atomic Age design with Googie architecture.

In consumer products, Franciscan China’s Starburst dinnerware pattern, introduced in 1954 as part of their "Modern Americana" promotion, brought the atomic aesthetic into American homes. The pattern featured turquoise, yellow, and green atomic stars on cream-colored earthenware with irregularly shaped pieces that emphasized the futuristic, space-age appeal. The pattern was produced until the mid-1960s and remains highly collectible.

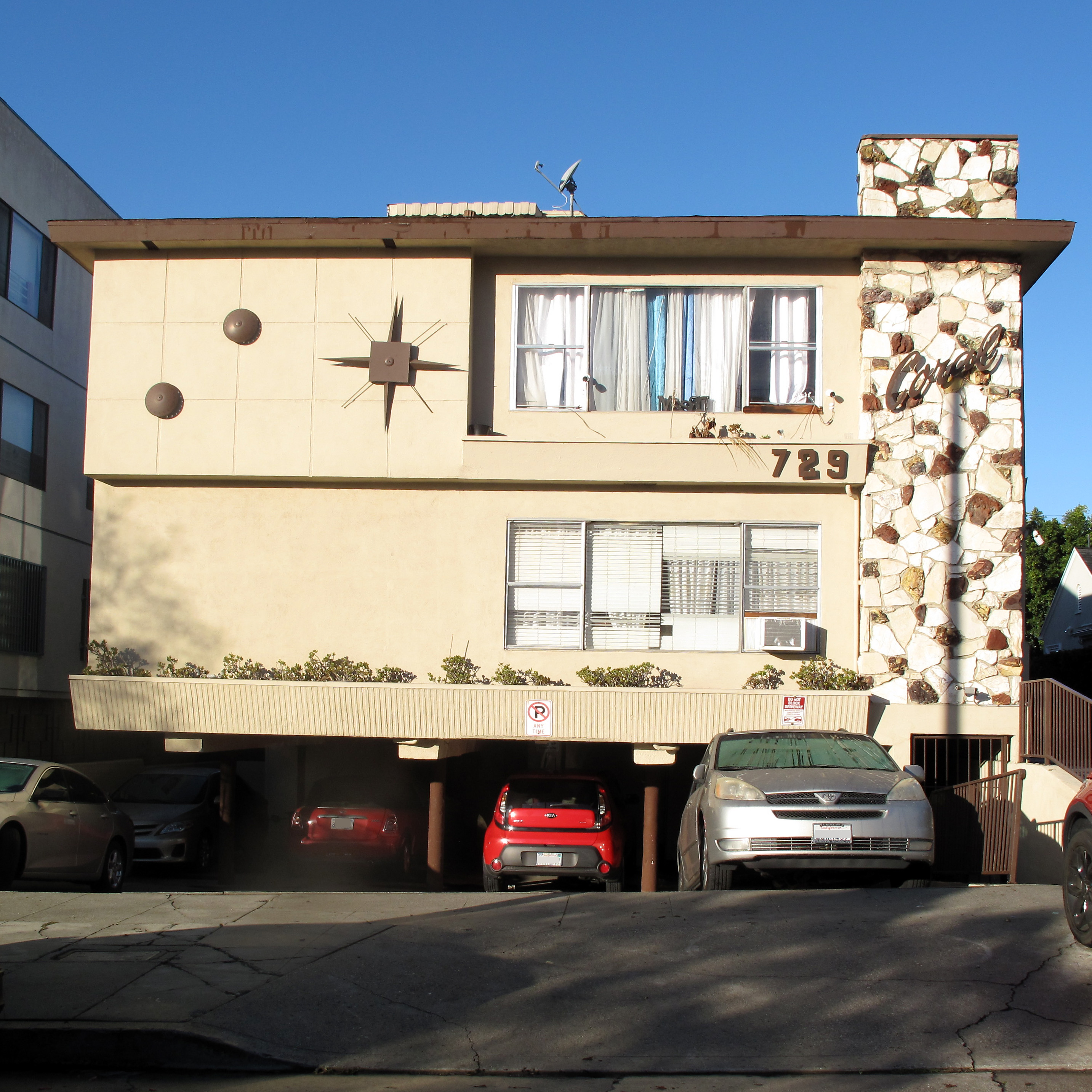
A Los Angeles apartment building featuring a decorative starburst ornament

The starburst appeared on countless other household items including light fixtures (particularly the Sputnik chandelier style), textiles, wallpaper, furniture, and decorative objects. The dingbat apartment buildings common in Los Angeles during this period often featured a single starburst ornament as their primary exterior decoration. The motif's flexibility allowed it to be adapted to various scales and materials, from small decorative details to large architectural elements, making it a defining visual signature of the era.

=== Biomorphic Shapes ===
Free-form biomorphic shapes also appear as a recurring theme in Atomic Age design. British designers at the Council of Industrial Design (CoID) produced fabrics in the early 1950s that showed "skeletal plant forms, drawn in a delicate, spidery graphic form", reflecting X-ray technology that was becoming more widespread and familiar in pop culture. These botanic designs influenced later Atomic Age patterns that included repeating organic shapes similar to cells and organisms viewed through a microscope. Art historians do not see the popularity of organic forms during this time as a coincidence, with some speculating it was a search for meaning during a time of such sociopolitical uncertainty and the looming potential threat of new technologies.

There are similarities between many Atomic Age designs and the mid-century modern trend of the same time. Elements of Atomic Age and Space Age design were dominant in the Googie design movement in commercial buildings in the United States. Some streamlined industrial designs also echoed the influence of futurism that had been seen much earlier in Art Deco design.

== Space Age design ==
Whereas Atomic Age motifs and structures leaned towards design fields such as architecture and industrial design, Space Age design spread into a broader range of consumer products, including furniture, clothing fashion, and even animation styles, as with the popular television show The Jetsons. Beginning with the dawn of the Space Age (commonly attributed to the launch of Sputnik in October 1957), Space Age design captured the optimism and faith in technology that was felt by much of society during the 1950s and 1960s, together with the design possibilities afforded by newly accessible materials like fibreglass that became more widely available since World War II. Space Age design also had a more vernacular character, appearing in accessible forms that quickly became familiar to mainstream consumers. Since the end of the 1970s, Space Age design has become more closely associated with kitsch and Googie architecture for popular commercial buildings such as diners, bowling alleys, and shops, though the finest examples of its kind remain desirable and highly collectible. "Space Age design is closely tied to the pop movement [...] the fusion of popular culture, art, design, and fashion".

=== Fashion ===
Two of the most well-known fashion designers to use Space Age themes in their designs were Pierre Cardin and Paco Rabanne. Pierre Cardin established the futuristic trend of using synthetic and industrial materials in fashion, with "forward thinking" innovations in his early 1960s work. Cardin "popularized the use of everyday materials for fashion items, like vinyl and metal rings for dresses, carpentry nails for brooches, and common decorative effects such as geometric cut-outs, appliqués, large pockets, helmets and oversized buttons". In 1964, Cardin launched his "space age" line, and André Courrèges showed his "Moon Girl" collection, introducing the white go-go boot style and other icons of the 1960s. The Japanese designer, Issey Miyake from Hiroshima, worked in Paris and New York from 1964 to 1970, and used many atomic age forms, and technologically produced materials in his work. In 1970 he moved to Tokyo to continue these innovations. Miyake cites his first encounter with design as being two bridges in his hometown, Hiroshima, at the hypocenter of the atomic bombing in World War II.

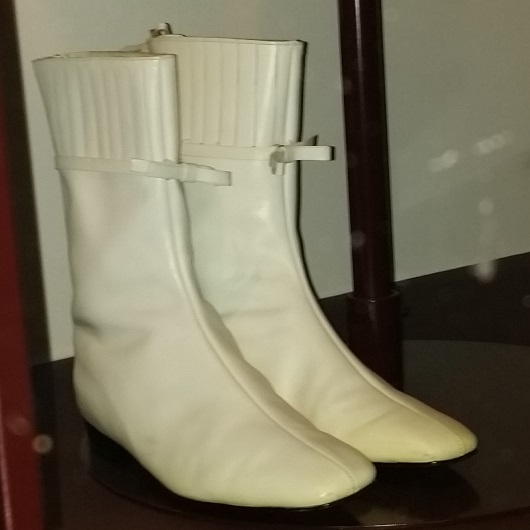
Go-go boots by Andre Courreges, 1965

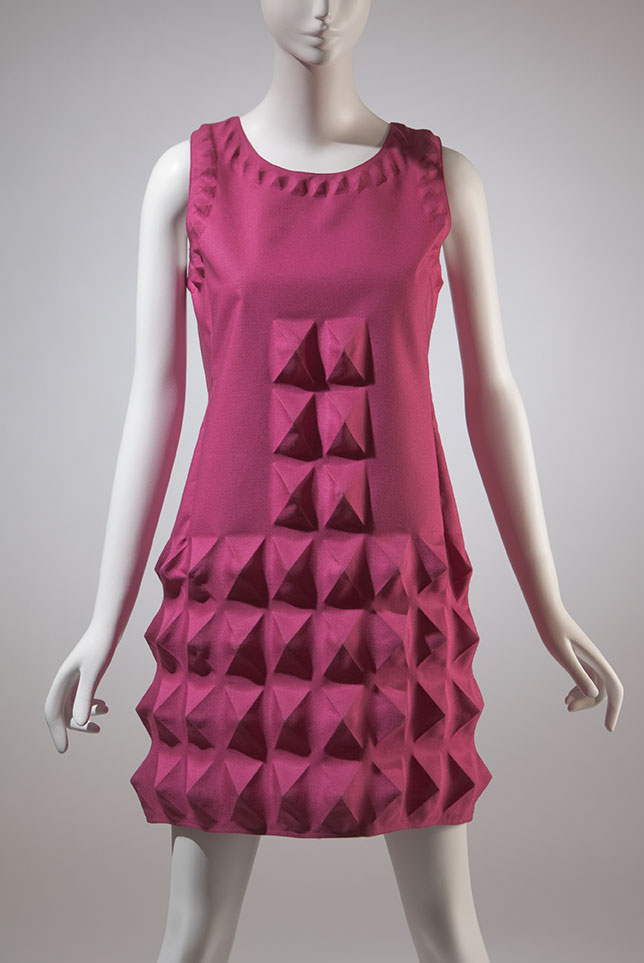
3D heat molded Dynel Dress by Pierre Cardin, 1968

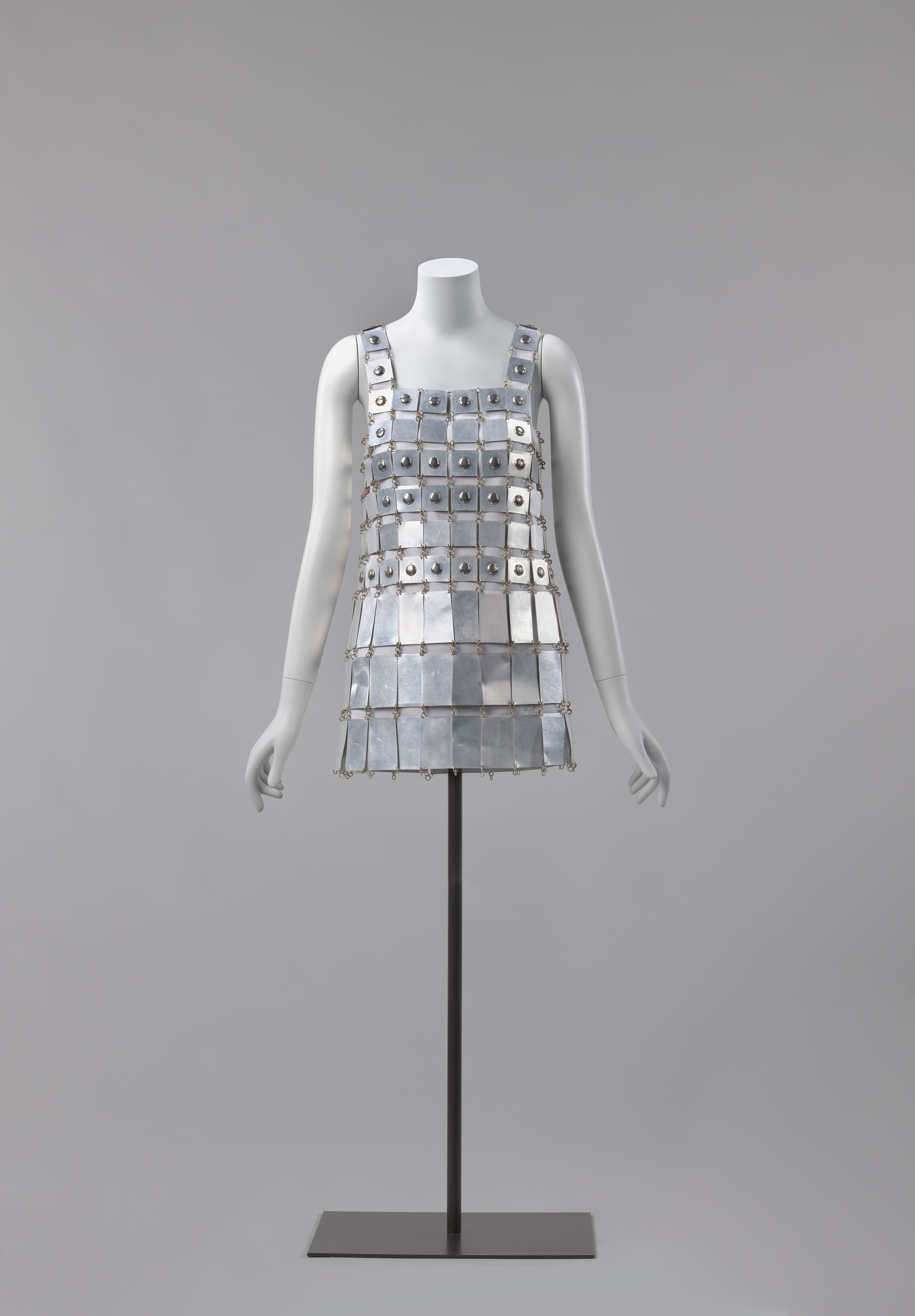
Mini dress by Paco Rabanne, 1967

=== Architecture ===
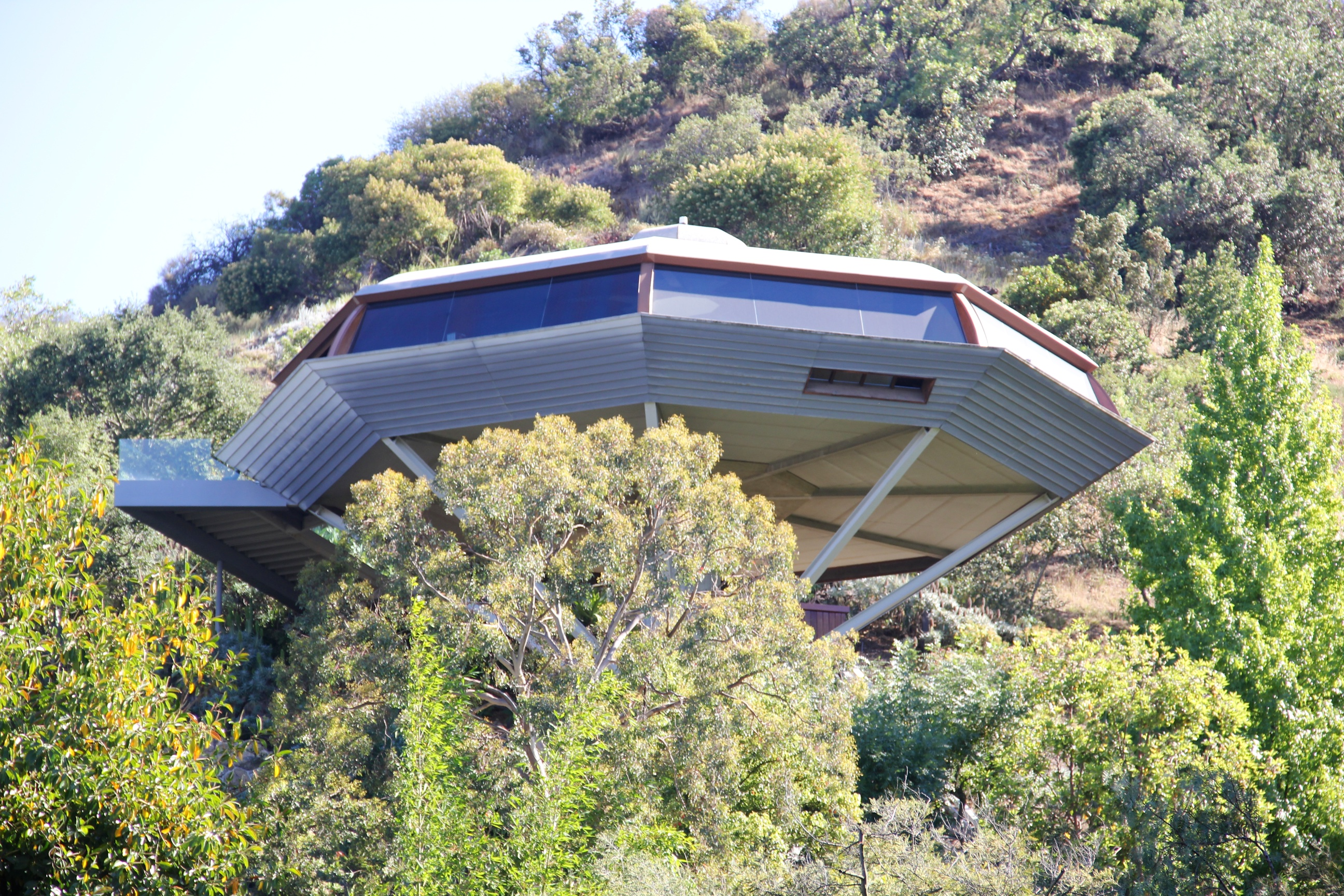
Chemosphere house, Los Angeles

The Chemosphere house, designed by John Lautner in 1960, has become an icon of the atomic age home. The octagonal shaped house is cantilevered on a steep slope in the Hollywood Hills, California. At the time, Encyclopædia Britannica cited it as the "most modern home built in the world."

==== Vernacular architecture ====
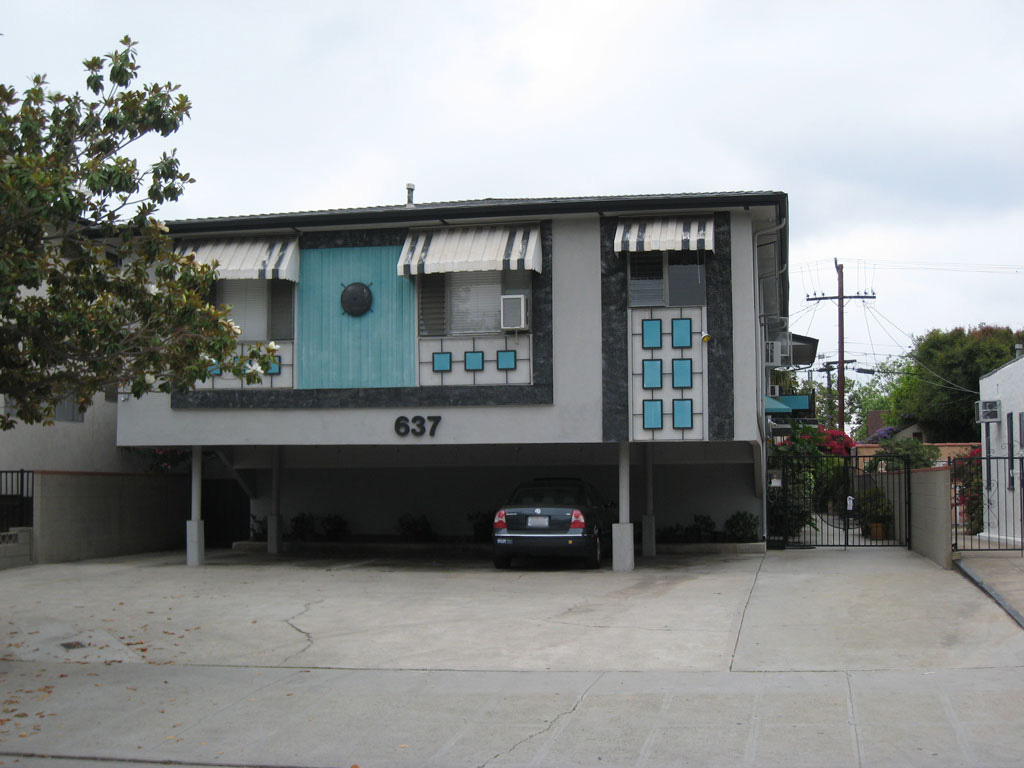
Example of "dingbat" apartment facade

The dingbat apartment house, ubiquitous in the Los Angeles, California area, was built between 1945 through the 1960s, and fused a purist style with googie influence. The architect, Francis Ventre, coined the term "Dingbat" for these quickly built stucco and frame simple structures. These structures often had a single exterior ornament in the shape of a starburst, boomerang, or pattern of rectangles.

== Designers ==
Some of the leading designers who employed the Atomic Age style in their works include:

- Charles Eames
- Ray Eames
- Pierre Koenig
- Virgil Exner
- Richard Neutra
- Eero Saarinen
- Frank Lloyd Wright
- Eero Aarnio

== Furniture ==
Atomic Age furniture design strived for modernity with bright colors, round, organic designs, and a common use of plastics and metals. The spherical and rounded motifs in tables, chairs, lamps, doors, and countless others were derived from the atom, continuing to establish its place as an icon for the technological advancements of the time. Rockets and spacecraft were reflected in contrasting angular forms. White became the dominant color in the Atomic Age home, intensifying the room's brightness and highlighting the sculptural furniture. Contrastingly, warm mustard yellows and oranges in decor and fabrics were indicative of feelings of positivity and a hopefulness for the future.

Space Age inspired furniture remains popular to this day, with popular designs including the following:

- Panton Chair by Verner Panton
- Selene Chair by Vico Magistretti
- Egg Ball Chair by Eero Aarnio
- Tulip Chair by Eero Saarinen
- Sputnik Chandelier by Gino Sarfatti

== See also ==
- Atomic Age
- List of Googie architecture structures (United States)
- Modernism
