= John Lautner =

American architect (1911–1994)

- Born: John Edward Lautner; July 16, 1911; Marquette, Michigan, U.S.
- Died: October 24, 1994 (aged 83)
- Education: Northern State Teachers College
- Occupation: Architect
- Spouses: Mary Faustina Roberts (m. 1934; div. 1947) Elizabeth Gilman (m. 1948; died 1978) Francesca (m. 1982)
- Children: 4
- Parent(s): John Edward Lautner; Vida Gallagher

John Edward Lautner (/ˈlɔːtnər/; July 16, 1911 – October 24, 1994) was an American architect. Following an apprenticeship in the mid-1930s with the Taliesin Fellowship led by Frank Lloyd Wright, Lautner opened his own practice in 1938, where he worked for the remainder of his career. Lautner practiced primarily in California, and the majority of his works were residential. Lautner is perhaps best remembered for his contribution to the development of the Googie style, as well as for several Atomic Age houses he designed in the late 1950s and early 1960s, which include the Leonard Malin House, Paul Sheats House, and Russ Garcia House.

== Biography ==
Lautner was born in Marquette, Michigan, in 1911, and was of mixed Austrian and Irish descent. His father, John Edward Lautner, who migrated from Germany ca. 1870, was self-educated, but gained a place at the University of Michigan as an adult and then studied philosophy in Göttingen, Leipzig, Geneva and Paris. In 1901, he was appointed as a professor of language and sociology at the recently founded Marquette Northern State Normal School (now Northern Michigan University), where he later became head of the French and German department. In 1907, Lautner married Vida Cathleen Gallagher (née Gallagher), the daughter of Irish immigrants and one of his students at Northern. His mother became an interior designer and painter. The couple had two children: John Lautner Jr., born in 1911, and Kathleen Lautner, born in 1915.

The Lautners were keenly interested in art and architecture and in May 1918, their Marquette home "Keepsake", designed by Joy Wheeler Dow, was featured in the magazine The American Architect. A crucial early influence in Lautner's life was the construction of the family's idyllic summer cabin, "Midgaard", sited on a rock shelf on a remote headland on the shore on Lake Superior. The Lautners designed and built the cabin themselves and his mother designed and painted all the interior details, based on her study of Norse houses.

In 1929, Lautner enrolled in the Liberal Arts program at his father's college – now renamed Northern State Teachers College – where he studied philosophy, ethics, physics, literature, drafting, art, and architectural history, read the work of Immanuel Kant and Henri Bergson, played woodwinds and piano, and developed an interest in jazz. He furthered his studies in Boston, Massachusetts and New York City. In 1933, Lautner graduated with a degree in Liberal Arts.

In April 1933, after reading the autobiography of Frank Lloyd Wright, Vida Lautner approached the architect, who had recently launched his apprenticeship program at Taliesin. Lautner was quickly admitted to the Taliesin Fellowship, but he had recently become engaged to a neighbor, Mary Faustina ("MaryBud") Roberts, and could not afford the fees, so Vida approached MaryBud's mother, who agreed to pay for the couple to join the program. John soon realized that he had little interest in formal drafting and avoided the Taliesin drafting room, preferring daily duties of "carpenter, plumber, farmer, cook and dishwasher, that is an apprentice, which I still believe is the real way to learn". From 1933 to 1939, he worked and studied under Wright at the studios in Wisconsin and Arizona.

Lautner progressed rapidly under Wright's mentorship. By 1934, the year he and MaryBud married, he was preparing design details for a Wright house in Los Angeles for Alice Millard, working on the Playhouse and Studios at Taliesin, and he had the first of many articles (under the masthead "At Taliesin") published in the Wisconsin State Journal and Capital Times. The following year, he was assigned to what became a two-year project supervising a Wright-designed house in Marquette for MaryBud's mother. In 1937, he agreed to oversee the construction of the Johnson residence "Wingspread" (his personal favorite among the Wright projects he worked on) near Racine, Wisconsin and traveled with Wright to supervise photography of the Malcolm Willey House in Minneapolis, Minnesota, which became a key source for his own small houses. He was also deeply involved in the construction of the Drafting Room at Taliesin West – which influenced the design of his Mauer House (1946) – collated photographs of Wright's work for a 1938 special issue of Architectural Forum and later briefly returned to Taliesin to help assemble models and materials for a 1940 Museum of Modern Art exhibition.

Lautner left the Fellowship in early 1938 (primarily because MaryBud was pregnant) to establish his architecture practice in Los Angeles, but he told his mentor that, while seeking an independent career, he remained "ready to do anything you or your Fellowship need". They worked together on around eleven Los Angeles projects over the next five years and their association continued sporadically. The Lautners arrived in Los Angeles in March 1938, and their first child Karol was born in May. Lautner's first independent project was a low-cost $2500 one-bedroom frame house for the Springer family, built with his contractor friend Paul Speer, but this was to be the only product of their brief collaboration. In September 1938, Wright contacted him and this led to Lautner's supervision of a series of Los Angeles domestic projects, the Sturges, Green, Lowe, Bell, and Mauer houses.

His first significant solo project was his own Los Angeles home, the Lautner House (1939), which helped to establish his name – it was the subject of Lautner's first article on his work, published in the June–July edition of California Arts & Architecture, and it was featured in Home Beautiful where it was lauded by Henry-Russell Hitchcock as "the best house in the United States by an architect under thirty". During this period, Lautner worked with Wright on the designs of the Sturges House in Brentwood Heights, California and the unbuilt Jester House. Lautner supervised the building of the Sturges House for Wright, but during construction he ran into serious design, cost, and construction problems which climaxed with the threat of legal action by the owners, forcing Wright to bring in students from Taliesin to complete repairs.

In the meantime, the Bell and Green projects had both stalled due to rising costs. The Greens canceled, but Wright gave the Bell commission to Lautner. He was also engaged to supervise the Mauer house when the Mauers dismissed Wright for failing to deliver the working drawings in time. Although the Mauer House was not finished for another five years, the Bell House was quickly completed and it consolidated the earlier success of the Lautner House, earning him wide praise and recognition – the University of Chicago solicited plans and drawings for use as a teaching tool, and it was featured in numerous publications over the next few years including the Los Angeles Times, a three-page spread in the June 1942 issue of Arts and Architecture, the May 1944 issue House and Garden (which declared it "the model house for California living"), a California Designs feature centering on the Bell and Mauer houses, Architectural Forum, and The Californian.

During 1941, Lautner was again brought in to oversee two more Wright projects that had run into trouble: the redesign of the Ennis House and an ill-fated project for a lavish Malibu residence ("Eaglefeather") for filmmaker Arch Oboler. This was beset by many problems (including the tragic drowning of Oboler's son in a water-filled excavation). A Lautner-designed retreat for Oboler's wife was eventually built.

In 1942, he designed a caretaker's cottage for the Astor Farm (since demolished), and in 1943, he joined the Structon Company, where he worked on wartime military construction and engineering projects in California, giving him valuable exposure to current developments in construction technology. This also marked the end of his professional association with Frank Lloyd Wright.

In 1944, Lautner pursued joint ventures with architects Samuel Reisbord and Whitney R. Smith before becoming a design associate in the practice of Douglas Honnold. He collaborated with Honnold on several projects including Coffee Dan's restaurants on Vine St., Hollywood, and on Broadway in downtown Los Angeles, and a remodel of the Beverly Hills Athletic Club (since demolished) as well as two solo projects, the Mauer House and the Eisele Guest House. Another significant landmark this year was the article "Three Western Homes" in the March edition of House & Garden, which included floor plans of the Bell Residence and four (uncredited) photos of the house by Julius Shulman. These photos marked the start of a lifelong association between architect and photographer; over the next fifty years Shulman logged some 75 assignments on various Lautner projects (for Lautner and other clients) and his photos of Lautner's architecture have appeared in at least 275 articles.

Lautner left the Honnold practice in 1947, primarily because he had begun a relationship with Honnold's wife Elizabeth Gilman (although the two men reportedly remained friends). He separated from MaryBud (they divorced later that year) and moved into the Honnold residence at 1818 El Cerrito Place, where he established his own design office. He embarked on a string of significant design projects including the Carling Residence, the Desert Hot Springs Motel, the Gantvoort Residence and Henry's Restaurant in Glendale. Lautner soon established a high media profile and throughout the late 1940s and early 1950s his work featured regularly in both popular and professional publications, including Architectural Record, Arts & Architecture, House & Garden, Ladies' Home Journal and the Los Angeles Times.

Lautner and Gilman married in 1948 and MaryBud returned to Marquette with their four children, daughters Karol (1938–2015), Mary Beecher (b. 1944), Judith Munroe (b. 1946) and son Michael John (1942–2005). Lautner's output that year included the Tower Motors Lincoln-Mercury Showroom in Glendale and the Sheats "L'Horizon" Apartments, but most of the other designs dating from that year were domestic commissions that were never built.

There were more important commissions in 1949–1950 including the Dahlstrom Residence, Googie's Coffee House and the UPA Studios in Burbank. During 1950, he was part of a group exhibition of sixteen California architects at Scripps College in Claremont, California, and in 1951 his work was included in Harris and Bonenberg's influential guidebook A Guide to Contemporary Architecture in Southern California (Watling, 1951). Lautner obtained his architectural license in 1952 and in February, House and Home published the genre-defining Douglas Haskell article "Googie Architecture", which included two Shulman photographs of the Los Angeles restaurant accompanied by an article on the Foster Carling House and L'Horizon apartments.

From the late 1940s until his death, Lautner worked primarily on designing domestic residences. His early work was on a relatively modest scale but in later years, as his reputation grew and his client base became more affluent, his design projects became increasingly grand, culminating in the palatial 25,000 sq ft (2,300 m^{2}) Arango residence in Acapulco, Mexico. This project, along with his appointment as Olympic Architect for the 1984 Summer Olympic Games in Los Angeles, were among the highlights of his later career.

After many years of chronic illness, Elizabeth Lautner died in 1978; in 1982 Lautner married her caretaker, Francesca. Lautner's last years were also marred by declining health and loss of mobility.

Decades after his death, Lautner's work experienced a significant critical reappraisal with the 1999 publication of Alan Hess and Alan Weintraub's The Architecture of John Lautner (Rizzoli), and a 2008 exhibit at the Hammer Museum curated by architect Frank Escher and architectural historian Nicholas Olsberg. In 2009, Lautner was the subject of a documentary feature film directed by Murray Grigor, Infinite Space: The Architecture of John Lautner.

== Architecture and influence ==
Lautner designed over 200 architectural projects during his career, but many designs for larger buildings were never realised. In the architectural press, his extant body of work has been dominated by his domestic commissions; although he designed numerous commercial buildings including Googie's, Coffee Dan's and Henry's restaurants, the Beachwood Market, Desert Hot Springs Motel, and the Lincoln Mercury Showroom in Glendale; several of these buildings have since been demolished. With a handful of exceptions (e.g. the Arango Residence in Acapulco, the Turner House in Aspen, Colorado, the Harpel House #2 in Anchorage, Alaska, the Ernest Lautner house in Pensacola, Florida) nearly all of Lautner's extant buildings are in California, mostly in and around Los Angeles.

His distinctive application of the principles of organic architecture was, of course, profoundly influenced by his apprenticeship under Frank Lloyd Wright. Speaking of his time at Taliesin, he recalled:

... Mr. Wright was around all the time pointing out things that contributed to the beauty of the space, or the building, or the function of the kitchen, or the dining room, or what-have-you. And also the details of construction: how a certain way of detailing, which he would call grammar, contributed to the whole idea, the whole, the total expression. And then he kept accenting the idea that there wasn't any real architecture unless you had a whole idea ... So I really learned that you have to have a major total idea or it's nothing, you know; it's just an assembly. What most people do is an assembly of cliches or facades or what-have-you ...

Throughout his life Lautner was a passionate admirer of his mentor (to whom he typically referred as "Mr. Wright") and he remained a dedicated practitioner of organic architecture. His oral history interviews reveal that he had little regard for the International Style and its leading architects:

None of them had anything like Frank Lloyd Wright ... I actually heard in person Gropius, Corbusier, van der Rohe, and all of the big ones. And they're nothing compared to Frank Lloyd Wright. They're just nothing. So when people want to discuss it with me, it's just crazy, that's all. [laughter]

Nevertheless, even during the time he worked under Wright, Lautner sought to establish his own individual and distinctive style:

... I purposely didn't copy any of Mr. Wright's drawings or even take any photographs because I was a purist. I was [an] idealist. I was going to work from my own philosophy, and that's what he wanted apprentices to do, too: that wherever they went, they would contribute to the infinite variety of nature by being individual, creating for individuals a growing, changing thing. Well practically none of them were able to do it. I mean, I am one of two or three that may have done it, you know ...

Although his earlier works not surprisingly displayed some of the influence of his mentor, Lautner gradually developed his own style and consciously avoided anything that could be classified as "Wright-influenced". An exception among his later commissions to this was the Wolff House in West Hollywood (1963) which was often cited by his critics as a "Wrightian" building, much to his chagrin, but as he explained in 1986:

Yeah, that's what they have to grab on [to]. And that's a pain in the neck too, because the reason it is [Wrightian], is because the client, Wolff, asked for that. He wanted a Frank Lloyd Wright kind of house, and so I had to respect his request as a client. And that's the first and only time I did anything similar [to Wright]. And immediately everybody recognized it, and they think it's my best work, when it's the easiest. I could do those any time of the day or night. I could do a Frank Lloyd Wright house, but doing my own are more original.

As Lautner explained,

The main thing Wright stressed was to have a total idea. If you didn't have a total idea, you didn't have anything. All you had was an assembly of cliches. I never used any of his forms, never copied anything. He was against that.

Lautner's approach to architecture embodied many of Wright's philosophies and preoccupations, above all, the notion of a building as a "total concept". Like Wright, his work also shows a strong preoccupation with essential geometric forms – the circle and the triangle are dominant motifs in both his overall designs and his detailing – and his houses are similarly rooted in the idea of integrating the house into its location and creating an organic flow between indoor and outdoor spaces, although Lautner's work arguably took the latter concept to even greater heights.

Another point of similarity is that, like Wright, many of Lautner's houses were sited in elevated locations or "difficult" sites, hillsides or seashores –an approach that may have started with the construction of the family's summer cabin, "Midgaard", sited on a rock shelf– and were expressly designed to take full advantage of the vistas these sites offered; he also followed Wright's dictum of building on a slope rather than on the very top of a hill.

Lautner's work is especially significant for its radical expansion of both the technical and spatial vocabulary of domestic architecture. He achieved this through his use of the latest building technologies and materials, e.g., his pioneering use of glue-laminated plywood beams, steel beams and sheeting, and especially his ongoing exploration of the architectural possibilities of reinforced and prestressed concrete – and through his use of non-linear, open-plan and multi-level layouts, shaped and folded concrete forms, skylights and light-wells and panoramic expanses of plate glass. Another key characteristic of Lautner's architecture is his heterogeneous approach, not only in his overall concepts – each Lautner building is a unique design solution – but also in his use of materials, as Jean-Louis Cohen notes in his essay "John Lautner's Luxuriant Tectonics":

There is absolutely no dogma in Lautner's attitude to materials; as a result he never subordinates the design concept of his buildings to any rigid rule that would require the primacy of a single material in a project. Even where he demanded rigorous continuity and integrity, as with wood in the Walstrom House and concrete at Marbrisa ... he never allowed that to undermine the sense of structure and always took into account the need for a certain structural logic ... He was happy to bring together wood and concrete ... as he did in the Desert Hot Springs Motel ... to have cables meet concrete and plastic, as in the Tolstoy House, to carry a wooden roof on steel supports, as in the Garcia House, or, so evident in the Chemosphere, to allow three radically different materials to work with each other – a structure of laminated lumber to enclose the dwelling area, metal struts to carry it, those struts bolted onto the vertical concrete column that anchors the unit to the hill.

It is ironic that, although famous Lautner works like the Carling and Harpel houses, the Chemosphere and the Sheats Goldstein Residence have become inextricably linked with Los Angeles in the public imagination, Lautner repeatedly expressed his dislike of California. In his oral history interviews he was highly critical of the standard of architecture in Los Angeles, and idealised the rural Michigan environment of his youth, as he recalled in 1986:

My childhood, I had a hundred miles of beaches, private beaches, you know: no people, no nothing. I mean, just go swimming anywhere you want, and no problem. The coast here to me is just ugly, you know, it's crazy. Malibu is nothing to me, it's just crazy." ... Oh it was depressing. I mean, when I first drove down Santa Monica Boulevard, it was so ugly I was physically sick for the first year I was here. Because after living in Arizona and Michigan and Wisconsin, mostly out in the country, and mostly with good architecture ... this was the ugliest thing I'd ever seen ... If you tried to figure out how to make a row of buildings ugly, you couldn't do it any better than it's been done [here]. I mean they're just ugly, naturally ugly, all the way. There isn't a single, legitimate, good-looking thing anywhere.

=== Major works ===
==== Lautner Residence ====
In 1939, Lautner had just finished working with Frank Lloyd Wright and was trying to establish himself. He set out to build his first house on 25 feet of filled hillside in the Silver Lake area. The 1,200 square-foot house has three levels, which descend according to the contour of the hillside. The patio is the top level; next, the kitchen and dining area; at the bottom of the house is the living room. The house has a ceiling of redwood plywood, kitchen counters of mahogany, and walls and floors of bagac, an African wood. Lautner lived there for only two years and never built another for himself. The house was listed on the National Register of Historic Places in 2016.

==== Foster Carling House ====
The Foster Carling House is one of Lautner's most significant early works. It embodies many of his central design concerns and includes key features that he would continue to explore and develop throughout his career. It was also important as the project that united him with builder John de la Vaux. Fortuitously, the pair met through their wives, who knew each other socially – at the time, Lautner was having trouble finding contractors to work on his houses, and de la Vaux, a boat builder, was keen to move into housing construction. At his wife's suggestion, de la Vaux approached Lautner and offered to build the Carling House, and they sealed the deal with a handshake. As de La Vaux recounted in the 2009 Lautner documentary, the project was briefly halted by a rare snowstorm that dumped more than six inches of snow on the Hollywood area. Lautner's design incorporates many innovative features: He used external steel cantilever beams to support the roof of the hexagonal main living area, creating a completely open space, free of any internal columns. This design, and the house's hillside situation, combine to afford 360-degree views across Los Angeles. Another striking feature is the movable wall-seat – one entire wall section of the living area, with a built-in couch, is hinged on one side and supported by a caster on the other, allowing the entire structure to swing out, opening the room out to the adjoining terrace. This is an idea he revisited with the Turner Residence in Aspen. There is also a swimming pool that partly intrudes into the living area under a sheet of plate glass, a feature that he revisited to even greater effect in the Elrod House. The Carling House has become one of Lautner's most celebrated designs and marked the beginning of his fruitful collaboration with de la Vaux, which lasted through seven major projects, including the famous "Chemosphere".

==== Googie ====
Although best known for his residential commissions, Lautner was also an important contributor to the commercial genre known as Googie architecture. Alan Hess, author of Googie Redux: Ultramodern Roadside Architecture records Lautner's contributions to a new car-oriented architecture developing in Southern California by architects such as Lloyd Wright and Wayne McAllister from the 1920s on; Lautner's Coffee Dan's, Henry's, and Googie's defined an architectural approach to scale, signage, and commercial interior spaces. The term "Googie architecture" was coined in 1952 by "House and Home" editor Douglas Haskell after he spotted the Lautner-designed Googie's Coffee Shop while driving through Hollywood with architectural photographer Julius Shulman. Haskell used the term in a February 1952 House and Home magazine article on the new design style and it stuck, although it soon came to be used as a derogatory term in "serious" architectural circles.

Lautner first defined an architectural solution to the scale, function, and public space of car-oriented suburban architecture in his remodel of Henry's Restaurant in Glendale in 1947. Googie's Coffee Shop, designed in 1949, stood at the corner of Sunset Strip and Crescent Heights, next to the famous Schwab's Pharmacy; regrettably, it was demolished in 1989. It was distinctive for its expansive glass walls, arresting angular form, prominent roofline, and exuberant signage oriented to car traffic: an advertisement for itself. Another key Lautner work in the Googie genre was Henry's Restaurant (1957) in Pomona; its vaulted roof, resembling an inverted boat hull, arched over the interior booths and the large exposed beams (made from glue-laminated timber) carried through to the exterior, where they supported a slatted awning that shaded the drive-in area. Other architects spread the Modern aesthetic of the coffee shop/drive-in in such as Tiny Naylor's (Lautner employer Douglas Honnold), Ship's (Martin Stern, Jr.), and Norm's and Clock's (Armet and Davis.)

Googie became part of the American postwar Zeitgeist, but was ridiculed by the established architectural community of the 1950s as superficial and vulgar. "Googie was used as a synonym for undisciplined design and sloppy workmanship," reported historian Esther McCoy. Not until Robert Venturi's 1972 book Learning from Las Vegas did the architectural mainstream even come close to validating Lautner's logic. The style was denigrated by East Coast critics and Lautner's reputation suffered; as a result he became wary of talking to the press and it is notable that his 1986 UCLA oral history interviews include no references at all to these early projects.

==== Harpel Residence ====
This elegant hillside house was designed and sited to take advantage of the panoramic views of Los Angeles. Unfortunately, it was extensively altered by later owners, including an unsympathetic second-story addition and the planting of a large hedge beside the pool, which completely obscured the views it was meant to frame, but it was faithfully restored in 2014 by the present owner, Marc Haddawy, at a cost of over US$500,000.

==== Chemosphere ====
Lautner's reputation was considerably restored by his groundbreaking design for the Leonard J. Malin Residence, also known as the "Chemosphere" (1960), which has become one of his best-known and most influential creations. Located at 776 Torreyson Drive, Los Angeles, the house was designed for young aerospace engineer Leonard Malin in 1960 and built by John de la Vaux. The steep hillside site had been given to Malin by his father-in-law, but was considered impossible to build on until Lautner devised his design:

The typical way to approach it would have been to bulldoze out a lot and put in 30-foot-high retaining walls to try to hold up the mountain, which is just insane.

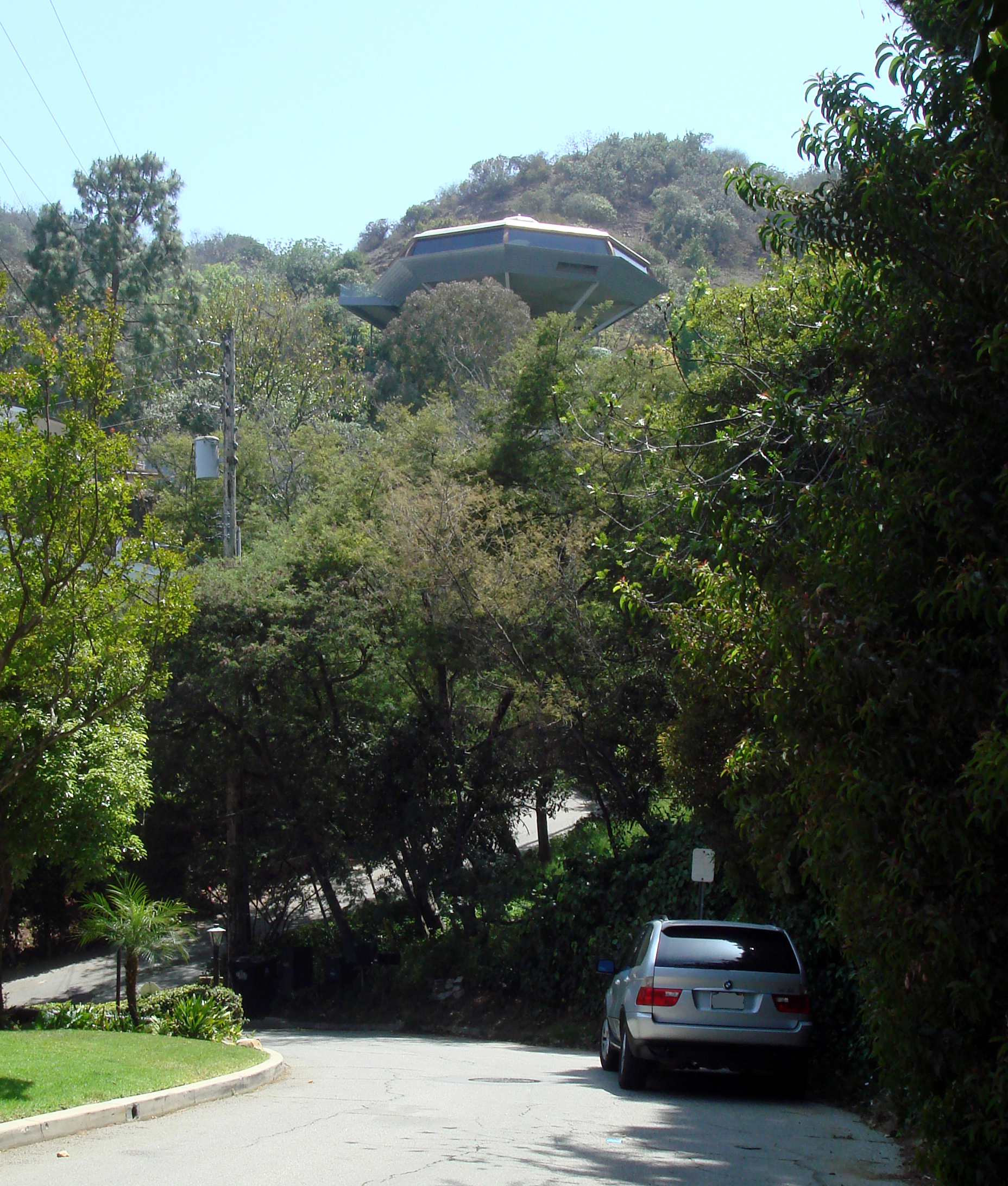
Malin Residence ("The Chemosphere"), Los Angeles (1960)

Lautner ingeniously solved the problem of the 45-degree slope by siting the entire house off the ground atop a 50-foot (15 m) concrete pillar that rests on a massive concrete pad 20 feet (6.1 m) in diameter and 3 feet (0.91 m) thick, buried in the rocky hillside. Halfway up the pillar, eight angled steel "spokes" – bolted onto bosses formed onto the surface of the column – splay out and up, supporting and stabilizing the outer rim of the house, and the center of the pillar also houses the utility cables and pipes. Lautner provided access from the driveway up the steep hillside by installing a funicular, which terminates at a short sloping gangway that leads up to the entrance. The house is octagonal in plan and lozenge-shape in section, and is often described as a "flying saucer". Since there are effectively no solid external walls – the entire outer "face" of the house is eight large picture windows – the Chemosphere enjoys a panoramic view over the San Fernando Valley. The massive, radiating glued laminated timber roof bearers and crossbeams, which echo the keel and ribs of a ship hull, were built by de la Vaux using the same type of mortise joints he had used in his boat building.

Construction of the highly unusual project saw the initial $30,000 budget blow out to over $100,000, but fortunately, Malin and Lautner were able to cover the shortfall by obtaining corporate sponsorship, including funding from the Southern California Gas Company and support from the Chemseal Corporation of America, who provided sealants, plastics and other materials, in return for use of the house for promotions and the right to name the house the "Chemosphere" for advertising purposes. After passing through a succession of owners, the building was rented out and occasionally used as a party venue and by the 1990s the interior was considerably degraded. German publisher Benedikt Taschen purchased the house in 2000 and restored it in collaboration with architects Frank Escher and Ravi Gunewardena, earning them an award from the Los Angeles Conservancy. The Chemosphere is now a Los Angeles landmark and in 2008 a panel of experts commissioned by the Los Angeles Times rated the Chemosphere as one of the "Top 10 houses of all time in L.A.". It is one of the most unusual and distinctive houses in the Los Angeles area and its unique design has led to it being featured or referenced in many media productions.

==== Reiner Residence ====
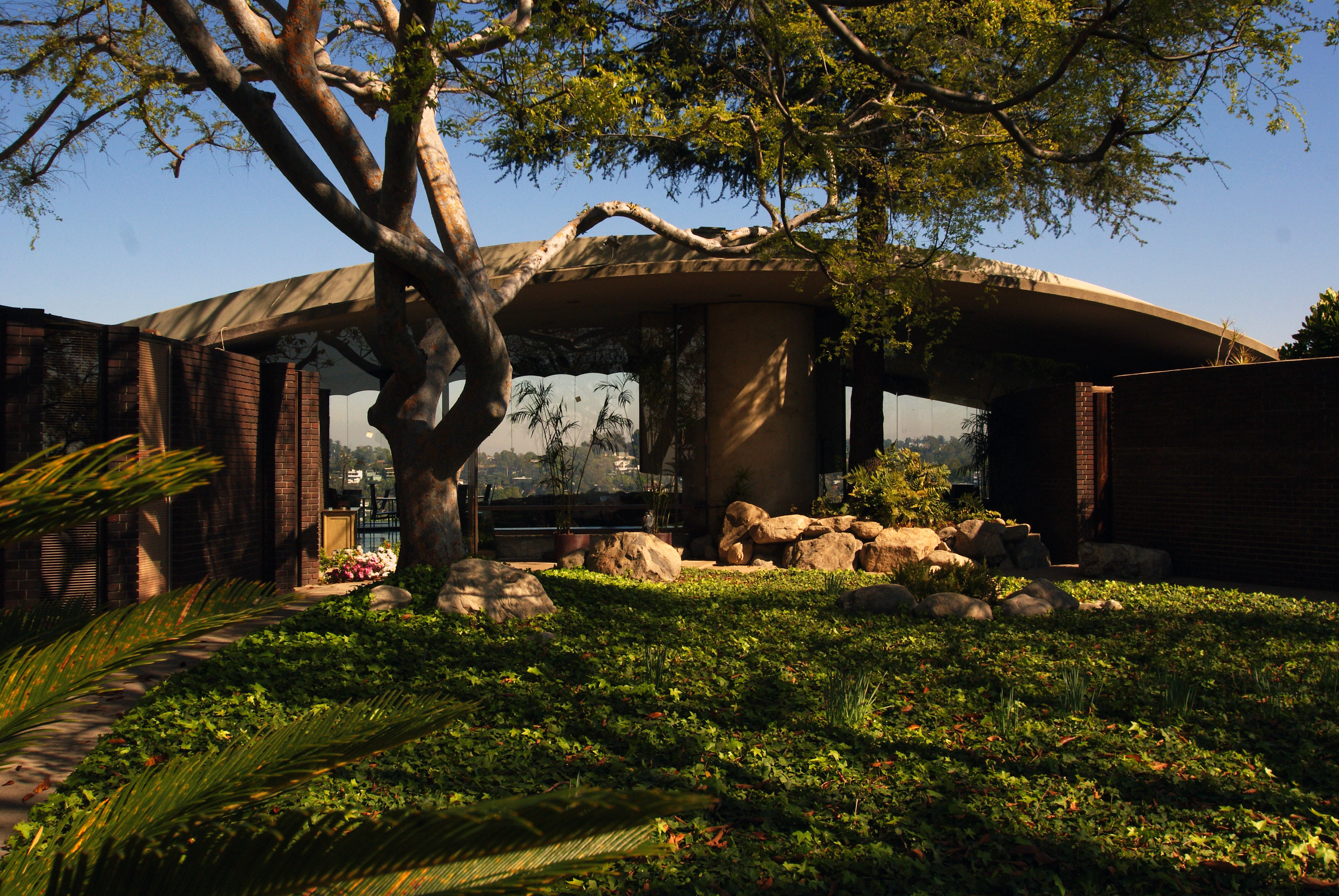
Silvertop

As his career developed. Lautner increasingly explored the use of concrete and he designed a number of homes for his more affluent clients that featured major structural elements fabricated from reinforced concrete. A commission by industrialist Kenneth Reiner, the 4,721-square-foot Reiner-Burchill Residence, "Silvertop" (1956–76), was his first major exploration of the sculptural possibilities of monolithic concrete as it was designed to follow the exact contour of its hilltop site. The home sits on 1.26 acres on the crest of a hill and is reached by a cantilevered concrete driveway that wraps around a circular guesthouse. It features a large arching concrete roof over the main house's living room. The curving living-room window wall is made of five hanging glass panels. The infinity-edge swimming pool was one of the first of its kind.

The project had a long and difficult gestation – while it was still being built, original owner Kenneth Reiner (with whom Lautner collaborated closely) was bankrupted by the fraudulent dealings of his business partners and was forced to sell the house. Lautner also faced opposition from the Los Angeles building certification authorities, who were dismayed by the radical design of the post-stressed concrete ramp, which cantilevers out from the base of the house without any columns supporting it from beneath, and is only four inches thick. Not surprisingly, the Los Angeles building inspector demanded a static load test to prove that it could take the weight of a car – a standoff that mirrored Lautner and Wright's earlier contretemps with skeptical building authorities who demanded load tests on Wright's famous "lotus pad" columns for the Johnson Wax Building. In the event, Lautner's load calculations proved flawless and in fact the instruments recorded more deflection in the concrete from the change in temperature when the sun went down than they did from the weight of the sandbags loaded onto the ramp to test it. The project then sat unfinished for some time. When it became available through bankruptcy in 1974, Philip and Jacklyn Burchill bought the home. They worked with Lautner to complete the home and moved there in 1976.

==== Garcia House ====
Garcia House was designed for Russ & Gina Garcia. Construction began in 1960 and was completed in 1962. Russ Garcia was a composer of music for the Walt Disney Co and worked with such talent as Julie London. Originally slated to have an entirely concrete roof, the City of Los Angeles was too unfamiliar with Lautner's far-out designs and would not issue a construction permit for anything other than wood glulam beams. A modest structure, Lautner's design incorporated the steep slope of the lot located off Mulholland Drive. The Garcia House achieved notoriety when it was featured in the film Lethal Weapon 2 starring Mel Gibson & Danny Glover. A full-scale model of the house was built in Simi Valley to film the scene where Gibson's character famously pulls the entire house down the hill with his pickup truck.

A realtor renamed it the "Rainbow House" in the '70s, mainly for the colored panes of glass in the living room, and the arched roofline, to help market the house for sale. The residence had multiple owners between the Garcias and its current owners, Bill Damaschke, an Oscar-nominated movie executive and Broadway producer, and John McIlwee, an entertainment business manager, who purchased the home in 2002 from actor Vincent Gallo. The two architecture aficionados embarked on an extensive restoration of the iconic structure, hiring renovation specialists Marmol Radziner for the design/build, Darren Brown for the interiors and Marcello Villano on landscape.

==== Elrod Residence ====
Arguably the most widely seen of Lautner's works, the Elrod House for Arthur Elrod (1968) became famous through its use as a location in the Bond film Diamonds Are Forever. Situated on a commanding hillside in the desert outside Palm Springs, California, its best-known feature is the large circular "sunburst" concrete canopy which appears to float above the main living area; this area also incorporates a large natural rock outcrop at the edge of the room, creating the impression that the fabric of the building is fused with the rock. The canopy is fitted with curved glass-and-aluminium sliding doors that allow the space to be completely opened around half its circumference, opening out to a semi-circular swimming pool and a broad terrace. The prime hilltop site offers sweeping views of the surrounding desert.

==== Desert Hot Springs Motel ====
Originally designed in 1947 as a planned community of over 100 buildings, storefronts and pools on 600 acres at Desert Hot Springs in the Coachella Valley, near Palm Springs, California. Lautner's client was movie director Lucien Hubbard, the winner of the very first "Best Picture" Oscar for the silent movie Wings. After building the first four-unit prototype and pool, the project came to a halt and was subsequently used for Hubbard's stars and starlets as a getaway from Los Angeles; it gradually fell into disuse and sat vacant for almost 20 years. After Hubbard's death in 1972, the 600 acres were subdivided and sold off; the pool property burnt down and was bought by the neighboring golf course to be rebuilt in a different design as their clubhouse. The prototype units were purchased by a buyer from San Diego, but sat empty for another nine years until an interior designer renovated them and put in kitchens and baths, although at some point the kitchens and baths were destroyed and removed. This owner kept the property for almost twenty years until the year 2000, renting out the rooms as apartments. It was then sold to Steve Lowe, who briefly ran it as the Lautner Motel. After Lowe died in 2005 the property went through the courts as was finally put back on the market in late 2006, when designers Ryan Trowbridge and Tracy Beckmann purchased it in 2007 for less than $400,000. The couple spent the next three-and-a-half years renovating and restoring the property. Their efforts won the approval of the Lautner Foundation, who sanctioned its renaming as the Hotel Lautner, in honor of its designer. The hotel re-opened for business in September 2011.

==== Hope Residence ====
The 17,500 sq ft (1,630 m^{2}) Dolores and Bob Hope Residence (1973), situated close to the Elrod Residence in Palm Springs, features a massive undulating triangular roof, pierced by a large circular central light shaft. The original uncompleted house was destroyed by a fire started by a welder's torch during construction. Bob and Dolores Hope interfered extensively in the second design, with the result that Lautner eventually distanced himself from the project. Although not well known and rarely available for public viewing (it is located within a private, gated community) it is one of the largest and most visually striking of Lautner's domestic designs. In February 2013, the property was put on the market for $50 million; but finally sold for $13 million in 2016.

==== Arango Residence ====
Arguably the pinnacle of Lautner's career, the vast (25,000 sq ft) "Marbrisa" in Acapulco was built for Mexican supermarket magnate Jeronimo Arango in 1973 and was jointly designed by Lautner and Helena Arahuete during her first year with the firm. Perched on a hilltop site, with uninterrupted views across the whole of Acapulco Bay, the main living quarters are surmounted by a large open terrace with spectacular views of the beach and bay, encircled by a "sky moat" which snakes around its edge; the terrace is itself topped by a huge, sweeping semi-circular angled awning made of cast, reinforced concrete.

==== Rancho del Valle rehabilitation center ====
Lautner designed the 11,200-square-foot Rancho del Valle rehabilitation center in 1979. In 2014, Santa Rosa-based Oakmont Senior Living offered to acquire the Winnetka Avenue site and to replace the Lautner building with a two-story, 84,978-square-foot facility better suited for eldercare. The Los Angeles Conservancy sought to save the building.

== Cultural impact ==
Several of Lautner's houses are now designated as Los Angeles Cultural-Historical Monuments.

=== In entertainment ===
His dramatic and photogenic spaces have been frequently used as film, TV and photography locations, and they have also influenced film production and set design:

- the Elrod Residence was the location for the sequence in the 1971 James Bond film Diamonds Are Forever in which Bond battles female assassins "Bambi" and "Thumper"
- the Chemosphere has been used several times as a film or TV location, including The Outer Limits (1964) and Brian De Palma's Body Double (1984). The design is also directly referenced in the video game Grand Theft Auto: San Andreas and the film Charlie's Angels and it was parodied (as Troy McClure's house) in an episode of The Simpsons. It also has influenced the design of the space-age stilt houses in the animated sitcom The Jetsons, which premiered two years after the house was built, and it closely resembles the design of the "Jupiter II" spacecraft in the sci-fi series Lost In Space. An exact copy of the Chemosphere interior is used as the set for Current TV
- the Reiner-Burchill Residence ("Silvertop") in Silver Lake has been featured in Less than Zero (1987)
- the Sheats Goldstein Residence just outside the border of Beverly Hills has been featured in The Big Lebowski, Bandits and Charlie's Angels: Full Throttle and is a sought-after location for fashion photo shoots
- the Garcia House ("Rainbow") in West Hollywood featured in Lethal Weapon 2 (1989)
- the "car cafe" set created for the Quentin Tarantino film Pulp Fiction was explicitly modelled on well-known examples of the Googie style, including Lautner's Googie diner (which was boarded up but still standing when the film was made) and Henry's Restaurant in Glendale
- In Twilight (1998), the George Jacobsen House doubled as Raymond Hope's house
- the J.W. Schaffer House of Glendale was home to the title character in A Single Man (2009)
- for the Iron Man films, production designer Michael Riva and concept artist Phil Saunders based the design of Tony Stark's mansion on Lautner's architecture. The exteriors of the building (a series of computer-generated images which were digitally composited into location photos of Point Dume State Preserve in Malibu) are strongly reminiscent of Silvertop and Marbrisa, fancifully blending many of Lautner's "signature" elements including the dramatic cliff-side location, large expanses of glass, classic "California split-level" layout and sinuous, organic lines
- Lautner is mentioned by English Albanian singer-songwriter Dua Lipa in her 2019 song "Future Nostalgia". As stated by Financial Times, the name-drop is a symbol for Lipa's desire to make her music sound futuristic and retro at the same time, associating it with Lautner's works.

Many Lautner buildings were at one point owned by celebrities. Between 2001 and 2007, his Segel Residence on Malibu's Carbon Beach was owned by actors David Arquette and Courteney Cox; it sold for US$33.5 million. Actor Vincent Gallo owned three Lautner homes, including the Wolff House in West Hollywood and the Garcia House. In 2014, actress Gwyneth Paltrow and singer Chris Martin purchased Lautner's 3,650-square-foot Garwood Residence in Point Dume for $14 million.

=== Public buildings ===
One of the few Lautner buildings regularly open to the general public is the Desert Hot Springs Motel, which was restored in 2001. The Bob Hope residence was made available for limited museum-sponsored public visits during 2008–2009.

In 2016, LACMA announced a donation of the Sheats Goldstein House from the current owner, James Goldstein. The donation includes the house, surrounding land, and a $17 million fund for the upkeep of the house, as well as some art in the house, including a piece by artist James Turrell. According to the Los Angeles Times, the museum will use the house to host events, fundraisers, exhibitions, and occasional public access tours.

=== Documentaries ===
In 1990, The Spirit in Architecture by director Bette Jane Cohen was produced by Aluminum Films. It featured interviews with Lautner filmed for the production.

In 2009, the Googie Company released the documentary feature film Infinite Space: The Architecture of John Lautner, directed by Murray Grigor. It features extensive contemporary and archival images of many of Lautner's key buildings (most of which are not open to the public), excerpts from Lautner's 1986 oral history recordings, interviews with Lautner's family, colleagues and clients, Lautner archivist Frank Escher and longtime Lautner fan Frank Gehry, as well as a moving on-site reunion of the three surviving principals who built the Chemosphere – Lautner's assistant Guy Zebert, original owner Leonard Malin, and builder John de la Vaux (who was 95 years old at the time of filming).

== Legacy ==
Lautner's legacy is now curated and perpetuated by the non-profit John Lautner Foundation. In 2007 the Foundation donated its archive of drawings, models, photographs, and other materials that belonged to John Lautner to the Getty Research Institute Special Collections.

In 2008, Lautner's life and work was the subject of a major retrospective exhibition at the Hammer Museum in Los Angeles. Reviewing the exhibition, author and critic Hunter Drohojowska-Philp lauded Lautner's work:

If ever there was an architect who deserved a show in an art museum, it is John Lautner. With the sweeping curves in space and the rhythm of repeated forms, his buildings stand as functional sculpture. They are unique entities unlike those of any other architect.

In 2011, the city of Los Angeles recognized the life and influence of the architect on what would have been his 100th birthday, by declaring July 16 John Lautner Day. A reception was held at the Los Angeles County Museum of Art, along with an exhibition and a panel discussion on Lautner's legacy.

== Honors ==
- Fellow of the American Institute of Architects, 1970
- Architectural Record Award for Excellence, 1971
- Distinguished Alumni Award, Northern Michigan University, 1975
- Architectural Record Award for Excellence, 1977
- Cody Award, 1980
- Los Angeles chapter, American Institute of Architects, Man of the Year, 1980
- Olympic Architect, 1984
