= Hope Residence =

House in Palm Springs, California, US

Coordinates: 33.7876°N 116.5118°W

General information
- Architectural style: Mid-century modern
- Location: 2466 Southridge Drive, Palm Springs, California, U.S.
- Year built: 1979
- Renovated: 2016
- Owner: Bob & Dolores Hope; Ronald Burkle

Height
- Height: 40 feet (12 m)

Technical details
- Material: African mahogany, gray quartzite, copper roof
- Size: 23,600 square feet (2,190 m^{2})

Design and construction
- Architect: John Lautner
- Other designers: Arthur Elrod, Dolores Hope

Renovating team
- Architect: Helena Arghuete
- Other designers: Brian Cooney Sr. & Jr.

The Hope Residence is a house at 2466 Southridge Drive in Palm Springs, California. It is 23,600 sq ft (2,190 m^{2}) in size. The house was built for the American entertainers Bob and Dolores Hope and completed in 1979. The house is noted for its large undulating triangular roof, with a large central light shaft.

== Location ==
The house is located in a gated community in Palm Springs. It is located above Palm Springs, with panoramic views of the Coachella Valley and the San Jacinto Mountains.

== Design ==
The grounds of the house contain a tennis court, putting greens, and a swimming pool made to resemble the likeness of Hope's profile. An outdoor fireplace in a large conical chimney is in the large exterior terrace of the house. The original roof design was a steel frame covered in wood.

The design of the house has been likened to a mushroom, a volcano, and a spaceship.

== History ==
The Hopes hired architect John Lautner for the project due to their admiration for his Elrod House nearby on Southridge Drive. When Bob Hope saw Lautner's model for the house in 1969 he quipped that "Well, at least when they come down from Mars they'll know where to go".

The house was destroyed by a fire from a welder's torch in its initial phase of construction in 1973, the cost of the fire was estimated at $500,000. Construction began four year later after legal issues regarding insurance and financial responsibility for the fire were settled.

Arthur Elrod, the chief interior designer for the house, died during the first phase of construction. When work began again in 1977 the original building plans as filed with the council were still valid. Dolores Hope became increasingly involved in the design of the house following its rebuild which caused Lautner to distance himself from the project. The Hopes hired a "Beverley Hills society decorator" to design the décor of the house which dismayed Lautner who had originally envisaged a modernist interior that made use of the natural light in the house's desert location. Dolores Hope had been inspired by Sunnylands, the nearby house of Walter and Leonore Annenberg, with its pink roof.

In February 2013, following Dolores’ death that year and that of Bob Hope in 2003, the property was put on the market for $50 million; the price was dropped to $25 million in 2014 and finally sold for $13 million in 2016 to Ron Burkle. Burkle owned the nearby Elrod House, also designed by Lautner, from 1995 to 2003.

=== Post 2016 remodelling ===
The former site architect of the Hope House, Helena Arghuete, managed the remodelling of the house following its 2016 sale. The modernist interior of the house as envisioned by Lautner was created by stripping the interiors and replacing the décor with natural materials. Arghuete was assisted by Lorenzo Jauregui, whose mother was the Hope's maid for 34 years. The father and son woodworkers Brian Cooney Sr. and Brian Cooney Jr. constructed 12 new doors (not to be confused with 6 feature doors clad with Stainless Steel that were fabricated by AEM) at the house to Lautner's design and installed African mahogany on the house's interior walls.
