= John G. Dow =

American politician

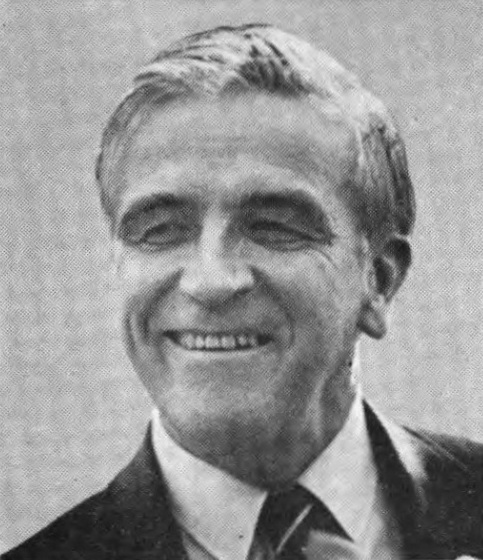

Member of the U.S. House of Representatives from New York's 27th district
- In office January 3, 1971 – January 3, 1973
- Preceded by: Martin B. McKneally
- Succeeded by: Howard W. Robison
- In office January 3, 1965 – January 3, 1969
- Preceded by: Katharine St. George
- Succeeded by: Martin B. McKneally

Personal details
- Born: John Goodchild Dow; May 6, 1905 New York City, U.S.
- Died: March 11, 2003 (aged 97) Suffern, New York, U.S.
- Party: Democratic
- Education: Harvard University; Columbia University

John Goodchild Dow (May 6, 1905 – March 11, 2003) was an American business executive, government administrator, and politician from New York. He was most notable for his three terms of service as a Democratic member of the United States House of Representatives from 1965 to 1969 and 1971 to 1973.

== Early life ==
Dow was born in New York City, the son of Elizabeth (Goodchild) and architect, artist, and author Joy Wheeler Dow. He was raised in New Jersey and Kennebunkport, Maine, and attended Brown University. He later transferred to Harvard University, from which he graduated with a Bachelor of Arts degree in government in 1927.

Dow was a business executive and consultant from 1929 to 1964, and specialized in strategic planning and systems analysis for large corporations. He received a Master of Arts degree in political science from Columbia University in 1937. From 1950 to 1964, Dow was the director of civil defense in Grand View, New York. From 1964 to 1965, he was chairman of Grand View's zoning board of appeals.

Active in politics as a Democrat, Dow ran unsuccessfully for the New York State Senate in 1954, the New York State Assembly in 1956, and Town Supervisor of Orangetown, New York, in 1963.

== Congressman ==
Dow was elected to Congress in 1964, defeating 18-year incumbent Katharine St. George. He was reelected in 1966, and served from January 3, 1965, to January 3, 1969, and was described as an early opponent of the Vietnam War. He was a delegate to the 1968 Democratic National Convention. He unsuccessfully ran for re-election to the U.S. House in 1968, losing to Republican Martin B. McKneally. From 1968 to 1970, Dow worked on the staff of the U.S. House. In 1970, he defeated McKneally and served in Congress a second time from January 3, 1971, until January 3, 1973.

== Later career ==
In 1972, Dow was redistricted into New York's 26th congressional district following publication of the 1970 United States Census; he lost his re-election bid to Republican Benjamin A. Gilman. Dow was assistant director of New York State's comprehensive employment training act program from 1976 to 1982, and was the founder of Americans Against Nuclear War in 1980. He unsuccessfully ran for Congress in 1974, 1982 and 1990.

== Artist ==
Dow and his wife dealt in antiques, and were regular participants in antique shows throughout the northeast United States. Dow was also a landscape painter, and his works were exhibited at the Edward Hopper House in Nyack, New York, and other galleries.

== Death ==
He died in Suffern, New York, on March 11, 2003.

== Legacy ==
The post office in Tappan, New York, was named the John G. Dow Post Office Building in 2003.

== Family ==
In 1930, Dow married Harriet (maiden name Dow) of Maine (1906-2001). Their children included Thomas, Timothy, Diantha, and Sophia.

== General Reference ==
- John Goodchild Dow Papers, 1967-1971. M.E. Grenander Department of Special Collections and Archives, University Libraries, University at Albany, State University of New York (hereafter referred to as the Dow Papers).

== Sources ==
=== Newspapers ===
- "Obituary, John G. Dow". The Journal News. White Plains, NY. March 14, 2003.
- "Death Notice, John G. Dow". The Washington Post. Washington, DC. March 15, 2003.

=== Books ===
- Round, Harold F. (1968). The History & Genealogy of the Varrell-Verrill and Associated Families. Bryn Mawr, PA: H. F. Round.

U.S. House of Representatives
Preceded by Katharine St. George	Member of the U.S. House of Representatives from New York's 27th congressional district 1965–1969	Succeeded by Martin B. McKneally
Preceded by Martin B. McKneally	Member of the U.S. House of Representatives from New York's 27th congressional district 1971–1973	Succeeded by Howard W. Robison
Honorary titles
Preceded by Mike Mansfield	Oldest living United States representative (Sitting or former); October 5, 2001 – March 11, 2003	Succeeded by Augustus F. Hawkins
