= J.W. Schaffer House =

- J. W. Shaffer House
- U.S. National Register of Historic Places
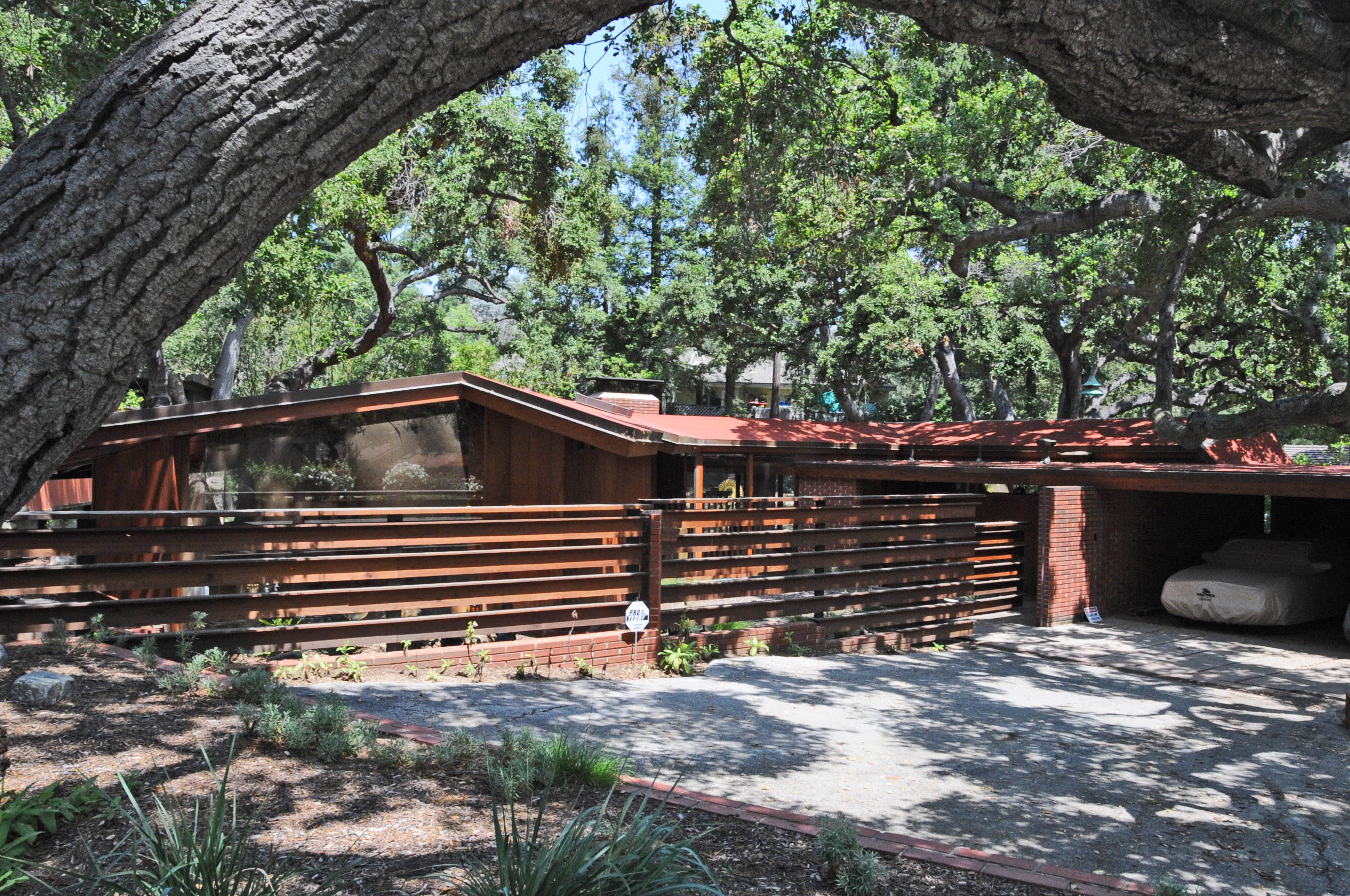

- Location within the Los Angeles metropolitan area Location within California Location within the United States
- Location: 527 Whiting Woods Road, Glendale, California
- Coordinates: 34°12′54.51″N 118°14′58.63″W
- Built: 1949
- Architect: John Lautner
- Architectural style: Organic architecture
- NRHP reference No.: 16000174
- Added to NRHP: April 19, 2016

The J. W. Schaffer House is a residence in Glendale, California. It is on the National Register of Historic Places as a work of the architect John Lautner.

== Description ==
The J. W. Schaffer House is on the northeast edge of the Verdugo Mountains, in the Whiting Woods neighborhood of Glendale, California. The house, constructed in 1949, is an example of the Wrightian-influenced Mid-Century Modern architecture of master architect John Lautner. The house exhibits the modest scale and massing, horizontal emphasis, large expanses of glass, and asymmetrical plan associated with Mid-century Modern houses, along with a connection to outdoors and focus on the specific site conditions of Organic architecture.

The design worked around the existing oak trees. It makes extensive use of glass for its exterior, and is said to "feel like a newly pitched tent or a wood cabin that provides shelter and privacy without boxing out nature. "

== History ==
The site was originally used by the Shaffer family as a picnic ground, but later decided to live there permanently.

The Shaffer house was restored in the 2000s and put up for sale in 2008, eventually selling in 2012 for $1.35 million.

== In popular culture ==
The 2009 film A Single Man, directed by Tom Ford and starring Colin Firth and Julianne Moore, used the Shaffer house as George's (Firth's) residence. The interior and exterior were shown in the film.
