= Arthur Elrod =

American interior designer (1924–1974)

- Born: Arthur Dea Elrod, Jr. August 8, 1924; Anderson, South Carolina, U.S.
- Died: February 18, 1974 (aged 49); Palm Springs, California, U.S.
- Education: Clemson University; Chouinard Art Institute
- Occupation: Interior designer

Arthur Dea Elrod, Jr. (August 8, 1924 – February 18, 1974) was an American interior designer, perhaps best known for the Elrod House his home in Palm Springs, California, which he designed in collaboration with architect John Lautner in 1968.

== Early life ==
Elrod was born in Anderson, South Carolina, grew up on a farm, and studied design at South Carolina's Clemson University, before attending the Chouinard Art Institute in Los Angeles.

== Career ==
In 1954, Elrod and Harold "Hal" Broderick started Arthur Elrod and Associates, an interior design firm on Palm Canyon Drive in Palm Springs, and went on to hire William C. Raiser, Steve Chase, and others. According to the Palm Springs Bureau of Tourism, Elrod's innovative midcentury modern style "became a hallmark of the Palm Springs aesthetic" and helped solidify the city's reputation as a center of modernist design.

In 1968, Elrod designed his Palm Springs home, now known as Elrod House, built by architect John Lautner.

== Personal life ==
Elrod was openly gay.

The parties he held at the Elrod House were "legendary", Bill Blass held a fashion show, Playboy did a November 1971 feature, Pleasure on the Rocks, and the house was used as Willard Whyte's mansion in the 1971 James Bond film, Diamonds Are Forever. The house has been described as the "ultimate bachelor pad", and it has been noted that increasing numbers of the "pads" in Playboy in the 1970s belonged to out gay men like Elrod.

Elrod was a close friend of Bob Hope and his wife Dolores.

Elrod and his associate, William Raiser, died in a traffic accident on February 18, 1974, when their Fiat sportscar was hit by a drunk teenage driver. Elrod was 49 years old.
