= Martin B. McKneally =

American politician

Martin McKneally
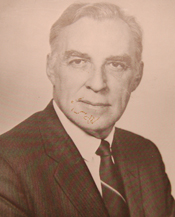

Member of the U.S. House of Representatives from New York's 27th district
- In office January 3, 1969 – January 3, 1971
- Preceded by: John G. Dow
- Succeeded by: John G. Dow

Personal details
- Born: Martin Boswell McKneally; December 31, 1914 Newburgh, New York, U.S.
- Died: June 14, 1992 (aged 77) Newburgh, New York, U.S.
- Party: Republican
- Education: College of the Holy Cross (BA); Fordham University (LLB)

Military service
- Allegiance: United States
- Branch/service: United States Army
- Years of service: 1941-1946
- Rank: Major
- Unit: Army Judge Advocate General's Corps; Central Pacific Area Headquarters
- Battles/wars: World War II

Martin Boswell McKneally (December 31, 1914 – June 14, 1992) was a Republican member of the United States House of Representatives from New York. He also served as the National Commander of The American Legion from 1959 to 1960.

== Early life and education ==
McKneally was born in Newburgh, New York, the son of George F. and Ellen (née Lahey) McKneally. He attended Newburgh's public schools, and graduated from Newburgh Free Academy. McKneally graduated from the College of the Holy Cross in 1936 and Fordham University School of Law in 1940. McKneally was admitted to the bar and practiced law in Newburgh and New York City.

== Military service ==
McKneally was drafted in 1941. He attended The JAG School (then at University of Michigan) and entered U.S. Army JAG Corps. He received his commission as a second lieutenant in the Army Judge Advocate General's Corps. He taught military law at Grinnell College, then deployed to the Pacific theater. In the Pacific, he served on the staff Lieutenant General Robert C. Richardson, commander of the Central Pacific Area. He was released from service in 1946 with the rank of major.

== Continued career ==
He was New York's state American Legion commander from 1957 to 1958, and national American Legion commander from 1959 until 1960. His administration of the American Legion was notable in that he disaffiliated the 40 and 8 Society from the Legion due to their racially discriminatory membership requirements.

McKneally was active in local government, and served as president of Newburgh's school board. He was a special counsel to Lieutenant Governor Malcolm Wilson from 1960 to 1968, and counsel to the 1964 World's Fair from 1961 to 1965. In 1968, he was elected to Congress, defeating Democratic incumbent John G. Dow. He served from January 3, 1969, until January 3, 1971.

== Tax evasion charges ==
McKneally was a candidate for re-election in 1970, but it was revealed during the last month of the 1970 campaign that he had not paid Federal income taxes for many years. He claimed that the IRS had over withheld him, but the voters did not believe him and he was defeated by Dow, 52% to 48%. McKneally was later found guilty of tax evasion and sentenced to one year of probation and fined.

== Death and burial ==
McKneally never married and had no children. His siblings included his brother George, who served as mayor of Newburgh. He died at the Veterans Administration facility in Castle Point, New York on June 14, 1992. He was buried at Cedar Hill Cemetery and Mausoleum in Newburgh.

== See also ==
- List of American federal politicians convicted of crimes
- List of federal political scandals in the United States
- List of United States representatives from New York

Non-profit organization positions
Preceded by Preston Moore	National Commander of the American Legion; 1959–1960	Succeeded by William Burke
U.S. House of Representatives
Preceded by John G. Dow	Member of the U.S. House of Representatives from New York's 27th congressional district 1969–1971	Succeeded by John G. Dow
