= Robinwood =

Historic house in Illinois

- U.S. National Register of Historic Places
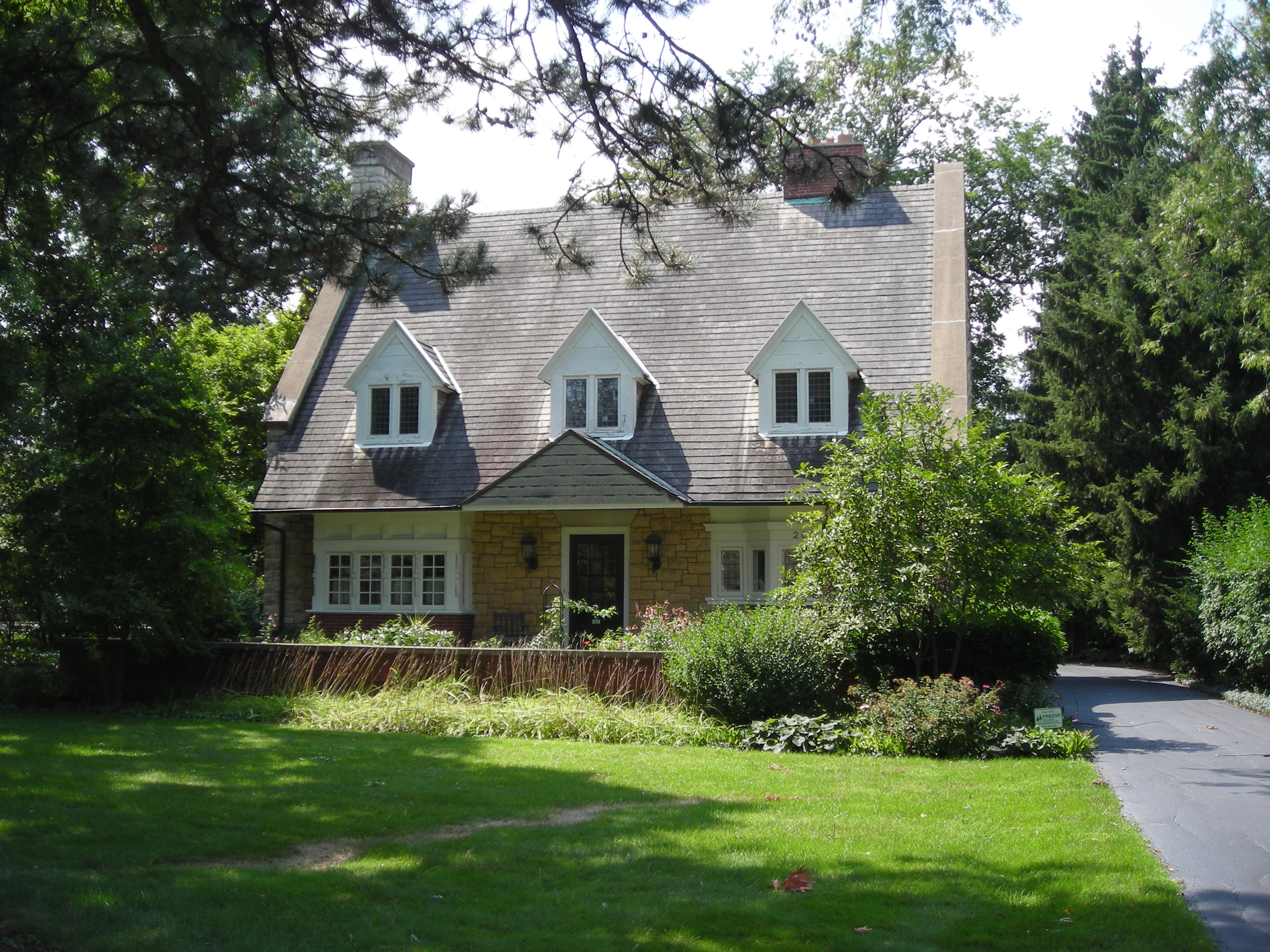

- Location within Illinois Location within the United States
- Location: 208 Arlington; Elmhurst, DuPage County, Illinois, U.S.
- Coordinates: 41°53′49″N 87°56′14″W
- Built: 1908
- Architect: Joy Wheeler Dow
- Architectural style: Late 19th And 20th Century Revivals (English Cottage)
- NRHP reference No.: 03001463
- Added to NRHP: January 21, 2004

Robinwood, also known as the George H. Miller House, is a historic residence in Elmhurst, Illinois.

== History ==
George H. Miller worked as a high school teacher in Marshall, Michigan, but decided to take a new job working in Chicago at Sears, Roebuck and Co. Shortly thereafter, Miller decided to form his own business, the Miller Fibre Box Company. The business was profitable, and he sold it to retire at the age of fifty. In his later years, Miller and his wife Bernice were active in Elmhurst city affairs.

Robinwood was built in 1908 by Joy Wheeler Dow, an architect who wanted to contrast the styles of Frank Lloyd Wright and Walter Burley Griffin while still maintaining appeal to the growing middle class. He had no formal training, and primarily built single-family homes in New Jersey. Robinwood was particularly heavily influenced by one of Dow's buildings, Princessgate, in Wyoming, New Jersey. English-based designs were popular in the northwestern suburbs of Chicago—Tudor Revival style residences were particularly popular in Elmhurst. It is thought that Robinwood was somewhat influenced by the style, but more-so by the Arts and Crafts Movement burgeoning in England. Bernice Miller lived in the house until her death in 1936, when it was passed on to her sister, Jessie Porter. Mr. and Mrs. Almerico purchased the home in 1968. Robinwood was sold to Dr. And Mrs. Miller in September 2013.

== Architecture ==
Robinwood is on a 100-by-190-foot (30 m × 58 m) lot on the west side of Arlington Street north of Church Street. The house neighbored that of architect Walter Burley Griffin, though this house was demolished in the 1970s. The floor plan is simple, with four main rooms on each of its two main floors. The building is 44 by 28 feet (13.4 m × 8.5 m) with a single gable running horizontally with deep eaves. A shingled gable extends over the main doorway. Robinwood has three bays, each with a dormer on the second floor. The house has a stone chimney on the south wall of the house while a brick chimney protrudes from the ridge of the roof, aligned with the northernmost dormer. The building's exterior walls are constructed from Indiana limestone.
