= Chemosphere =

House in Los Angeles, California

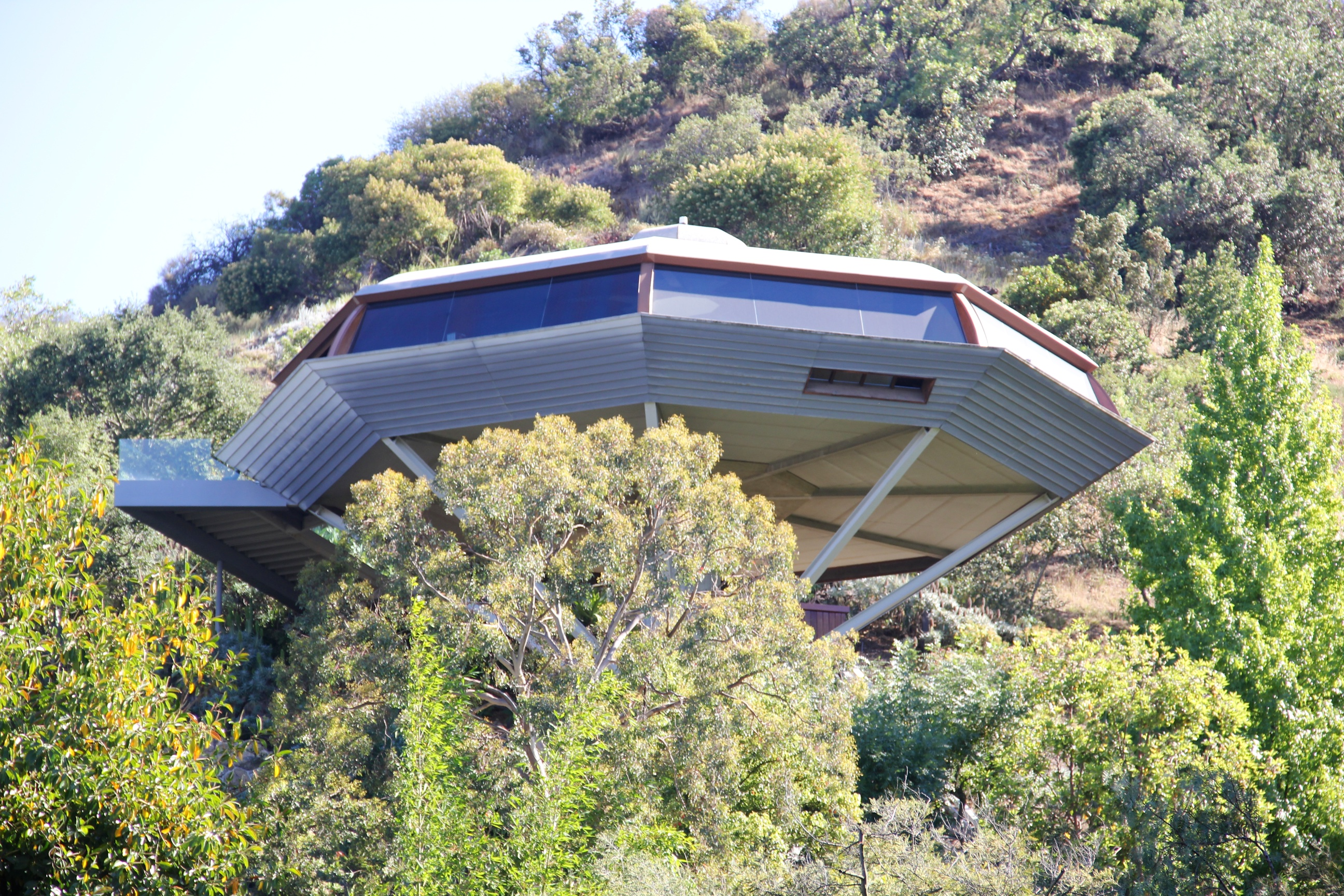
- Chemosphere, 2012

- Location within the Los Angeles metropolitan area
- 34°7′39.2196″N 118°22′7.8240″W
- Location: 7776 Torreyson Drive; Los Angeles, California

Site notes
- Architect: John Lautner
- Architectural style: Modernist
- Owner: Private

Los Angeles Historic-Cultural Monument
- Designated: 2004
- Reference no.: 785

The Chemosphere is a modernist house at 7776 Torreyson Drive in Los Angeles, California, designed by John Lautner in 1960. The building, which the Encyclopædia Britannica once called "the most modern home built in the world", is admired both for the ingenuity of its solution to the problem of the site and for its unique octagonal design.

== Design ==
The building stands on the San Fernando Valley side of the Hollywood Hills, just off Mulholland Drive. It is a one-story octagon with around 2,200 square feet (200 m^{2}) of living space. Most distinctively, the house is perched atop a 5-foot-wide (1.5 m) concrete column nearly 30 feet (9 m) high. This design was Lautner's solution to a site that, with a slope of 45 degrees, was thought to be practically unbuildable. Because of a concrete pedestal, almost 20 feet (6 m) in diameter, buried under the earth and supporting the column, the house has survived earthquakes and heavy rains. The house is reached by a funicular.

Chemosphere is bisected by a central exposed brick wall with a fireplace, abutted by subdued seating, in the middle. The original decoration was provided by John H. Smith, the first African American admitted to the National Society of Interior Designers.

== History ==
The lot had been given to a young aerospace engineer by his father-in-law; despite his own limited means, the engineer, Leonard Malin, was determined to live there. Malin had $30,000 to apply to the project. The cost to build Chemosphere, $140,000 (equivalent to $1.52 million in 2025), was subsidized partly by barter with two sponsoring companies, the Southern California Gas Company and the Chem Seal Corporation. Chem Seal provided the experimental coatings and resins to put the house together and inspired the name Chemosphere. (Lautner originally wanted to call the house Chapiteau.) In the end, Malin paid $80,000 in cash. The Malins and their four children lived there until rising costs and the demise of the aerospace industry forced them to sell in 1972.

In 1976, the house's second owner, Dr. Richard Kuhn, was stabbed to death in a robbery by his lover and another man. The pair were subsequently convicted and sentenced to life in prison.

By 1997, the interior had become run down; for over a decade it had been rented out and used for parties and as a result the interior finishes had undergone major and anachronistic alteration. Because of its unique design it proved to be a difficult sell and sat on the market for most of its time as a rental property.

Since 1998, it has been the Los Angeles home of Benedikt Taschen, of the German publishing house Taschen, who has had the house restored; the only current problem with the residence is the relatively high cost of maintenance. The most recent restoration, by Escher GuneWardena Architecture, won an award from the Los Angeles Conservancy. Preservation architect Frank Escher wrote the first book on Lautner a few years after moving to Los Angeles in 1988, and oversees the John Lautner Archives. During restoration, the architects added details that were unavailable 40 years before, as the technology simply did not exist. The gas company tile was replaced by random-cut slate, which could not be cut thin enough in 1960, despite Lautner's desire for such a finish. The architects also replaced the original thick framed windows with frameless glass. Tashen commissioned a pastiche rug by German painter Albert Oehlen and a hanging lamp of bent Plexiglas strips by Jorge Pardo, a Los Angeles artist.

The Taschens planned to commission Dutch architect Rem Koolhaas to build a large new guesthouse at the base of Chemosphere on the site once owned by Leonard Malin's in-laws. The new house was intended to hold an art collection and library and to provide rooms enough for the four children the Taschens have between them. The plans were later cancelled due to fears the annex would visually compete with the main house.

== Media and landmark designation ==
The Chemosphere was declared a Los Angeles Historic-Cultural Monument in 2004. It was also included in a list of all-time top 10 houses in Los Angeles in a Los Angeles Times survey of experts in December 2008.

The house forms part of a retrospective of Lautner's work which was shown at the Hammer Museum in Los Angeles between August and October 2008.

The building was first used in a dramatic film as a futuristic residence in "The Duplicate Man", a 1964 episode of the ABC TV-program The Outer Limits, based on a science fiction story by American author Clifford D. Simak. Exterior scenes for the television episode were shot on location; a detailed sound stage set of the house's interior was built. The Chemosphere was also used in the 1984 film Body Double, directed by Brian De Palma and it directly inspired a house in the 2000 Charlie's Angels movie. In 1996, the Chemosphere was represented as Troy McClure's (voiced by Phil Hartman) fictional Springfield hilltop mansion in The Simpsons TV series. It appears in the end credits of the 2015 Disney fantasy film, Tomorrowland, starring George Clooney.

== See also ==
- Garcia House (Los Angeles, California)
