= Garcia House (Los Angeles) =

Coordinates: 34.122452°N 118.359013°W

- Interactive map of the Garcia House area

General information
- Type: House
- Architectural style: Mid-century modern
- Location: 7436 Mulholland Drive, Hollywood Hills, Los Angeles, California
- Construction started: 1962
- Owner: Nicholas Pritzker (2023)

Design and construction
- Architect: John Lautner

The Garcia House (also known as The Rainbow House) is a private home in the Hollywood Hills of Los Angeles, designed by architect John Lautner. Located on Mulholland Drive, it sits on stilts 60 feet above the canyon below. Also known as the "Rainbow House" for its parabolic roof over stained glass windows and a curved ceiling that rises to 30 feet in height, it has been described as "one of the 10 most important residences from the midcentury period in Los Angeles."

== History ==
The building was originally designed in 1962 for American composer and arranger Russell Garcia. The two-story structure features three bedroom and three bath structure in just over 2,500 square feet of living space. By 2002 it had undergone many changes from its original design and was in need of renovation.

In 2002, actor Vincent Gallo sold the house for $1.3 million to Bill Damaschke, a DreamWorks executive, and his partner, business manager John McIlwee. Damaschke and McIlwee then invested another $1 million on an extensive renovation, supervised by the Marmol Radziner design firm. They ultimately also added a fence to obstruct public views from the street into the glass-sided house.

== In popular culture ==
The exterior of the house is seen briefly in 1966 beach party film, Out of Sight, as the home of character John Stamp. The house was later prominently used as a location for the film Lethal Weapon 2, as well as in a 2011 commercial for Oliver Peoples eyewear featuring singer Devendra Banhart.
