= Elrod House =

Coordinates: 33°47′37″N 116°30′39″W

- Interactive map of the Elrod House area

General information
- Type: House
- Architectural style: Organic architecture
- Location: 2175 Southridge Drive, Palm Springs, California
- Completed: 1968

Design and construction
- Architect: John Lautner

The Elrod House is a residence in Palm Springs, California designed by American architect John Lautner and constructed in 1968. It is located on the edge of a hill at 2175 Southridge Drive in Palm Springs, California. The construction of the house was ordered by Arthur Elrod, the interior designer.

One of Lautner's many houses in Southridge and Palm Springs as a whole, the Elrod House is one of his most famous structures and an example of his so-called free architecture, where architecture and nature are combined. When the house was built, the soil was excavated but the rocks were kept in place. These rocks are part of the interior of the house and run straight through the walls and windows.

Its best-known feature is the large circular concrete canopy above the main living area with a circular glass design. The living room incorporates large rocks and opens onto an outdoor swimming pool and a terrace that offers a view of Palm Springs and the San Jacinto Peak.

== Culture and significance ==
The Elrod House's most notable appearance was as Willard Whyte's mansion in the 1971 James Bond film Diamonds Are Forever. The living room, swimming pool, and an interior room were displayed in the film.

The house has also been the site of photo shoots for adult publisher Playboy, and was featured in a 2010 tabloid from Yale University graphic design student Benjamin Critton.

The Elrod House was also showcased in the 2013 architecture documentary Infinite Space: The Architecture of Lautner.

== Recent events ==
Real-estate investor Michael J. Kilroy bought the Elrod House from billionaire Ron Burkle in 2003 for $5.5 million. During his ownership, Burkle updated the mechanics and restored the interior furnishings.

In April 2014, The Desert Sun reported that accusations in court documents alleged that Kilroy—who also owns two other Southridge properties—had stopped paying mortgages, most HOA dues, and property taxes. The Desert Sun article said that the Southridge Property Owners Association of Palm Springs filed a lawsuit against Kilroy in May 2012 for over $148,730 in assessments. Kilroy had reportedly signed promissory notes that did not pay the full dues. UK lender Lloyds Bank plc also filed a suit against Kilroy in Riverside County Superior Court in mid-2012, alleging Kilroy owed near $1.8 million for missed mortgage payments, as well as legal and other fees. The Desert Sun also reported that high winds in January 2012 had "lifted roof shingles from homes and buffeted sections of the Elrod House." At the time of publication in 2014, the article stated that portions of the roof were covered by "tarp canopies." The article said that a trial in the Lloyds Bank lawsuit was set for April 2015.

In May 2016, the house was turned over to a bank and its asking price was reduced to $8 million from the previous asking price of $10.5 million (which reflected a 2009 reduction from the earlier reported price of $13.89 million).
