= On Gold Mountain =

1995 book by Lisa See

On Gold Mountain: The One-Hundred-Year Odyssey of My Chinese-American Family
- Author: Lisa See
- Language: English
- Genre: Memoir
- Publisher: St. Martin's Press
- Publication date: 1995
- Publication place: United States

On Gold Mountain: The One-Hundred-Year Odyssey of My Chinese-American Family describes 100 years of author Lisa See's family history, providing a complex portrait of her family’s hard work, suffering, failures and successes as they moved from China to the United States. Speaking of the Chinese side of her family, See has said: "Things were so fractured and wild at home ... But the weekends with my grandparents became the real center for me ... It was the side of the family I identified more with. It was fun, romantic, solid".

== Overview ==
The memoir centers on Fong See (鄺泗), the author's great-grandfather and his second wife, Lettice Pruett (née Ticie). Fong See was one of the few who realized the dream of coming to the U.S. and finding "Gold Mountain". So many others left China with the same dream but ended up with their dreams shattered. Fong See, the family patriarch, became the richest man in Chinatown and was recognized by the powers of Los Angeles proper. In China he had even more influence as "Gold Mountain See". Although Ticie was a perfect partner for Fong See in helping him develop his growing number of stores and being the proud mother of many of his children, in the end their marriage was destroyed. Keenly aware of his wealth and influence, as Fong See grew older he felt that the Chinese view of men's superiority to women was correct. In marrying a 16-year-old Chinese girl, he found what he wanted—the perfect wife in her complete subservience to her husband. Ticie's love for Fong See was so strong, that after her separation from her husband, she gradually fell apart.

=== Analysis ===
Although See treats her male ancestors with detailed and objective commentary, it is the women's perspectives that seem the most powerful—for example, those of Lettice Pruett, Sissee See, Stella See, the actress Anna May Wong, who has the chance to speak to the reader "From the Grave", and Carolyn See, Lisa See's mother.

The memoir reaches out to a broad audience because of the way See connects her family's history to that of America and China—treating the role of Chinese men who were badly mistreated in laying track for railroad expansion, the "Roaring 20's", the Great Depression, World War II, and the years after the war. On Gold Mountain develops several very important themes—the difficulty of making connections across cultural and racial divides; the painful contrast between the dream ("Gold Mountain") and reality; the challenge of keeping love alive in the context of family problems and change. As See herself writes: "History is not just about wars and dates; it's something that happens to real people. Do they rise to the occasion and challenges or do they fail? This theme is in all of my books . . ."

On Gold Mountain is centered on problems Chinese men and women have faced in coming to America. In the three novels that follow (the Red Princess Mysteries), See reuses many of these elements—but shifts the focus to the difficulty Americans face in coming to and understanding China.

== Development ==
Despite the anti-miscegenation laws prevalent at the time, Fong See and Ticie Pruett married and had several children, including Florence "Sissee" See and Eddy See. Eddy, who opened the popular Dragon's Den nightclub in 1935, married Stella (née Copeland); they had a son, Richard, who married Carolyn (née Laws) and had a daughter, Lisa See.

Sissee See married architect Gilbert Leong; she first broached the family history to Lisa See in 1988, who began documenting it with the initial intent to send it out as a Christmas card for the rest of the family. Lisa continued gathering stories from her family after Sissee's death: "[Sissee] had given it her blessing by doing the interviews, and because she had died so early in my research, it was almost as if their speaking to me were a funeral gift, a way of fulfilling her wishes. If she were still alive, I'm still not sure how many of those people would have decided to let me interview them." Eventually, the history was developed into the nonfiction memoir, published in 1995. The store initially opened in 1888 by Fong See after moving from Sacramento to Los Angeles with Pruett, the F. Suie One Co., is still operated by Gilbert and Sissee's daughter, Leslee See Leong.

== Influence and legacy ==
The book has inspired both an opera, and a museum exhibition. It also provides helpful context for See's novel, Shanghai Girls. The time frame for Shanghai Girls is 1937-1957, corresponding to Parts IV and V of On Gold Mountain.
