= Chinese American Museum =

Museum in Los Angeles, California, United States

- 華美博物館

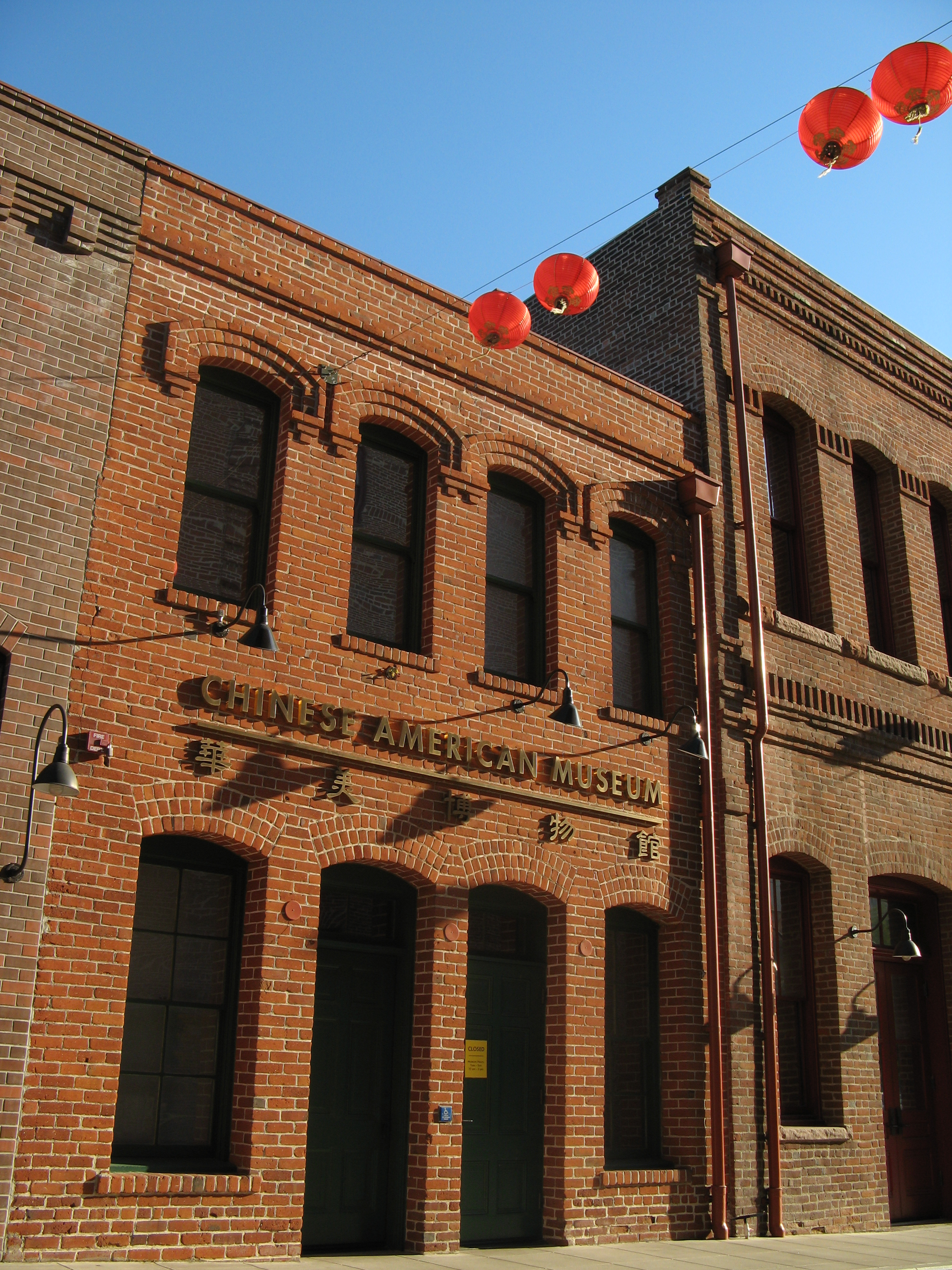
- CAM in 2007
- Established: 1984
- Location: 425 North Los Angeles Street; Los Angeles, CA
- Coordinates: 34.055832°N 118.239103°W
- Type: Chinese-American experience and history in Southern California
- Website: www.camla.org
Chinese American Museum
- Traditional Chinese: 華美博物館
- Simplified Chinese: 华美博物馆
Transcriptions
Standard Mandarin
- Hanyu Pinyin: Huáměi Bówùguǎn
Yue: Cantonese
- Jyutping: waa4 mei5 bok3 mat6 gun2

The Chinese American Museum (Chinese: 華美博物館; abbreviated CAM) is a museum in Downtown Los Angeles as a part of the El Pueblo de Los Angeles Historic Monument. It is dedicated to the history and experience of Chinese Americans in the state of California, the first such museum in Southern California. It presents exhibits of fine art by Chinese American artists as well as historical exhibits.

Planning for the museum began in October 1984, with the grand opening on December 18, 2003.

The museum is housed in the Garnier Building, the oldest surviving Chinese building in Southern California. The original Los Angeles Chinatown was located here before it was moved to New Chinatown for the construction of Los Angeles Union Station.

It is funded by the State of California, the City of Los Angeles, Friends of the Chinese American Museum, the Chinese Historical Society of Southern California, the Getty Foundation, the El Pueblo Association, the Center for Chinese Medicine, and hundreds of other donors.

== Exhibits ==
A permanent exhibit at the museum is the recreation of the Hing Yuen Hong Chinese Herb Shop of yesteryear. Another permanent exhibit opened on December 13, 2012, is "Origins: The Birth and Rise of Chinese American Communities in Los Angeles", celebrating the growth and development of Cantonese American enclaves from Downtown Los Angeles to the San Gabriel Valley.

Past exhibits have included "Sunshine and Shadow: In Search of Jake Lee", showcasing the 60 watercolor work of prolific artist Jake Lee; "Milton Quon's Los Angeles" (2005-2006); "The Art of Diana Shui-In Wong" (2006); and "Tyrus Wong (Chinese: 黃齊耀): A Retrospective" (2004), who was one of the earliest and most influential Chinese American artists.

- The exhibit on "Hollywood Chinese: The Arthur Dong Collection" was opened on October 23, 2009. It was based on Arthur Dong's Hollywood Chinese documentary that was broadcast on PBS on May 27, 2009. The documentary, a study of more than 90 years of Chinese Americans in films, ranging from the first Chinese American film The Curse of Quon Gwon that was produced in 1916 to Ang Lee's 2005 Brokeback Mountain. It closed on November 7, 2010.
- "Remembering Angel Island", commemorating the centennial anniversary of the opening of the immigration station in California, July 16, 2010 – January 31, 2012.
- Dreams Deferred: Artists Respond to Immigration, December 10, 2010 – December 18, 2011. This exhibition showcased local artists exploring the tensions, repercussions, hopes, and dreams of immigrant communities in the face of new immigration legislation, through a broad spectrum of art including street art, graffiti art, sculptures, painting and multimedia installations. Artists included: Augustine Kofie, Cache, Eriberto Oriol, Ernesto Yerena Montejano, Eyeone, K. Lovich, Jesus Barraza of Dignidad Rebelde, Joel “rage.one” Garci, John Carlos De Luna, LeHumanBeing, Oscar Magallanes, Patrick Martinez, Sand One, Shepard Fairey, Shark Toof, O.G. Slick, Swank, and Tempt.
- Breaking Ground: Chinese American Architects in Los Angeles (1945-1980), January 19, 2012 – June 3, 2012. Part of Pacific Standard Time: Art in L.A., 1945-1980, this exhibition showcased the achievements of four pioneering Chinese American architects whose contributions were critical to the development of Los Angeles’ urban and visual landscape between 1945 and 1980. The exhibit focused on the lives and work of Eugene Kinn Choy, Gilbert L. Leong, Helen Liu Fong, and Gin D. Wong, FAIA, four architects who played pivotal roles in the development of Mid-Century Modern and Googie Architecture movements, unique to California's Post-War architectural renaissance.
- LA Heat: Taste Changing Condiments, March 13-July 12, 2014. This art exhibition explored the impact of Sriracha and Tapatio in Los Angeles. The exhibit included a curated selection of artwork from artists of diverse backgrounds passionate and reflective about notions of identity, community, and foodways. Participating artists included: Edith Beaucage, Erik Benjamins, Audrey Chan, Ching Ching Cheng, The Chung!!, Chris Christion, Clayton Brothers, Eye One, Gajin Fujita, Daniel Gonzalez, Pato Hebert, Michael C. Hsiung, Phung Huynh, Tomo Isoyama, Nery Gabriel Lemus, Sandra Low, Trinh Mai, Patrick Martinez, Michael Massenburg, Kwanchai Moriya, Jose Ramirez, Yoshie Sakai, Jose Sarinana, Sand One, Shark Toof, Sket, Slick, Henry Taylor, Werc.

== Events ==
=== Chinese New Year Celebration ===
During the Chinese New Year celebration each year, a Lantern Festival is held at the museum, featuring live entertainment, including lion dancers, acrobatics, musical, Chinese knotting, and dance performances. "Long Story Short", a documentary on actress Jodi Long's family, was shown at the 8th Annual festival which was held on February 7, 2009. The 2013 Lantern Festival was held Saturday, March 2, 2013, 12 p.m. – 7 p.m.

=== Historymakers Awards ===
Each year, the museum sponsors the annual Historymakers Awards Banquet, which "honors extraordinary individuals who have made a significant impact or contribution towards the advancement of the Chinese American community and beyond." A 2009 honoree was Lisa Lu (Chinese: 盧燕), Chinese-American actress and documentary producer for excellence in film and entertainment.

CAMLA Historymakers Award Honorees
| No. | Date | Visionary (Note: Judge Ronald S.W. Lew Visionary Award (named for Lew starting in 2007)) | Lifetime Achievement (Note: Dr. Dan S. Louie Jr. Lifetime Achievement Award (simply the Dan Louie, Jr. Award from 2003–2006)) | Arts & Entertainment | Individual | Corporate | Justice & Leadership | Community & Giving | President (Note: President's Award) |
|---|---|---|---|---|---|---|---|---|---|
| 1 (1997) | Oct 22, 1997 | — | — | — | Charles Woo (Note: Excellence in Business) | — | Hon. March Fong Eu (Note: Excellence in Government Award) | — | — |
| 1 (1997) | Oct 22, 1997 | — | — | — | Peter Woo | — | Hon. Matthew Fong | — | — |
| 1 (1997) | Oct 22, 1997 | — | — | — | J. Paul Getty Trust (Note: Service to History) | — | Larry Wong (Note: Excellence in Leadership) | — | — |
| 2 (1998) | Oct 6, 1998 | — | Dan Louie Jr., Ph.D. (Note: Founders' Award) | Bessie Loo (Note: Excellence in Entertainment) | Cathay Bank | — | — | Southern California Chinese Lawyers Association (Note: Excellence in Community Service) | — |
| 2 (1998) | Oct 6, 1998 | — | Dan Louie Jr., Ph.D. | Bessie Loo | Iris Chang | — | — | Chinese Consolidated Benevolent Association (Note: Excellence in Community Empowerment) | — |
| 3 (1999) | Sep 11, 1999 | — | Albert Quon (Note: Also received Excellence in Business) | Michelle Kwan (Note: Excellence in Sports) | Charles Sie (Note: Excellence in Science & Engineering) | — | — | Friends of the Chinatown Library | — |
| 4 (2000) | Nov 17, 2000 | — | You Chung Hong | Joan Chen (Note: Excellence in the Arts) | Gareth Chang (Note: Excellence in Business Leadership) | Chinese Historical Society of Southern California (Note: Distinguished Service Award) | — | Deborah Ching | — |
| 5 (2001) | Dec 9, 2001 | — | Billy Lew (Note: Also received Excellence in Community Service) | Nancy Kwan (Note: Excellence in the Performing Arts) | — | — | Hon. Ronald S.W. Lew (Note: Excellence in Law and Justice Award) | — | — |
| 5 (2001) | Dec 9, 2001 | — | Billy Lew | Tyrus Wong | — | — | Hon. Ronald S.W. Lew | — | — |
| 6 (2002) | Nov 9, 2002 | — | Gerald Jann | — | Steven Chu (Note: Excellence in Science) | — | Hon. Delbert Wong | Dolores Wong (Note: Excellence in Community Leadership and Volunteerism) | — |
| 6 (2002) | Nov 9, 2002 | — | Gerald Jann | — | Bing Liu (Note: Excellence in Cultural Advancement in Letters) | — | Hon. Delbert Wong | Dolores Wong | — |
| 6 (2002) | Nov 9, 2002 | — | Gerald Jann | — | Caroline Hsu (Note: Special Youth Recognition) | — | Hon. Delbert Wong | Dolores Wong | — |
| 7 (2003) | Sep 21, 2003 | — | Munson A. Kwok, Ph.D. | Jackie Chan | Dominic Ng | — | Gilbert Cedillo | Dr. Annie Chin Siu (Note: Excellence in Medicine) | — |
| 7 (2003) | Sep 21, 2003 | — | Munson A. Kwok, Ph.D. | Jackie Chan | Peter Paanakker Estate (Note: Excellence in Cultural Advancement) | — | Gilbert Cedillo | Dr. Annie Chin Siu | — |
| 7 (2003) | Sep 21, 2003 | — | Munson A. Kwok, Ph.D. | Jackie Chan | Peter Paanakker Estate | — | Henry C. Lee, Ph.D. | Dr. Annie Chin Siu | — |
| 7 (2003) | Sep 21, 2003 | — | Munson A. Kwok, Ph.D. | Jackie Chan | Lisa See (Note: Excellence in History) | — | Henry C. Lee, Ph.D. | Dr. Annie Chin Siu | — |
| 8 (2004) | Sep 10, 2004 | Leroy & Carol Baca | Wilbur Woo | — | — | — | Antonio Villaraigosa | — | — |
| 8 (2004) | Sep 10, 2004 | Leroy & Carol Baca | Wilbur Woo | — | — | — | Debra W. Yang | — | — |
| 9 (2005) | Sep 10, 2005 | Joseph and Betty Wong | William Chun-Hoon | Andrew and Peggy Cherng (Note: Excellence in Culinary Culture) | Kenjohn Wang (Note: Excellence in Business and Immigration) | — | Lucille Roybal-Allard | — | — |
| No. | Date | Visionary | Lifetime Achievement | Arts & Entertainment | Individual | Corporate | Justice & Leadership | Community & Giving | President |
| 10 (2006) | Sep 10, 2006 | — | Robert and Edith Jung | Tim Dang | — | — | Assy. Judy Chu | Rev. Dr. Hoover Wong | — |
| 10 (2006) | Sep 10, 2006 | — | Robert and Edith Jung | C.Y. Lee (Note: Excellence in Literary Arts) | — | — | Assy. Judy Chu | Rev. Dr. Hoover Wong | — |
| 11 (2007) | Sep 9, 2007 | Lai Y. Lillian Lee Jang | Southern California Council of Chinese School | — | — | Southern California Edison (Note: Excellence in Corporate Leadership) | John Chiang | — | — |
| 11 (2007) | Sep 9, 2007 | Lai Y. Lillian Lee Jang | Southern California Council of Chinese School | — | — | Southern California Edison | Stewart Kwoh, Esq. | — | — |
| 12 (2008) | Sep 7, 2008 | — | — | Arthur Dong (Note: Excellence in Film) | Lisa Ling (Note: Excellence in Journalism) | Union Bank of California | — | Jim Tsai | — |
| 12 (2008) | Sep 7, 2008 | — | — | Arthur Dong | Lisa Ling | Union Bank of California | — | Pacific Alliance Medical Center, Inc. (Note: Excellence in Healthcare) | — |
| 13 (2009) | Sep 20, 2009 | Jean Bruce Poole | — | Lisa Lu (Note: Excellence in Film and Entertainment) | — | — | Matthew Lin | Paul Tea | — |
| 14 (2010) | Sep 19, 2010 | Kong Chow Benevolent Association | Dr. S.Y. Wong | — | Blake Chow (Note: Excellence in Law Enforcement) | Avery Dennison | — | Dr. Tim Siu | — |
| 15 (2011) | Sep 22, 2011 | Gin D. Wong, FAIA | — | — | Hwei Chih Cheng Sun (Note: Excellence in Education) | Chinese-American Engineers and Scientists Association of Southern California (Note: Excellence in Science and Engineering) | — | The Community Redevelopment Agency of the City of Los Angeles (Note: Community Impact Award) | — |
| 16 (2012) | Sep 27, 2012 | Latham & Watkins, LLP | Chinese American Citizens Alliance | — | — | Tom McKernan & The Automobile Club of Southern California | Carol Liu | Carl K. Moy, MD (Note: Excellence in Medicine and Community Service) | — |
| 17 (2013) | Sep 12, 2013 | Kin Hui | Charles W. Wong (Note: Also received Excellence in Architecture) | David Henry Hwang (Note: Excellence in Arts and Letters) | — | — | Michael F. Eng (Note: Excellence in Government Leadership) | Center for Asian Americans United for Self Empowerment | — |
| 18 (2014) | Sep 25, 2014 | Ming Hsieh | David Fon Lee | — | Kenneth Chin-Ming Lo (Note: International Corporate Award) | Rose Hills Memorial Park & Mortuary | Dr. James Bok Wong and Betty KC Yeow (Note: Excellence in Community Leadership) | Board of Directors, Tung Wah Group of Hospitals (Note: Humanitarian Award) | — |
| 19 (2015) | Sep 17, 2015 | Greg Penske | Jeffrey G. Chan | — | Paula Madison (Note: Chinese American Heritage & Legacy Award) | Enterprise Rent-A-Car | — | Dr. Ina Chan Un Chan, BBS (Note: Excellence in Leadership and Philanthropy) | — |
| No. | Date | Visionary | Lifetime Achievement | Arts & Entertainment | Individual | Corporate | Justice & Leadership | Community & Giving | President |
| 20 (2016) | Sep 15, 2016 | Susanna & Evans Lam | Bill Imada | Fresh Off the Boat | Gang Ding | — | Kent Wong | Esther Woo Jan (Note: Excellence in Community Services Award) | — |
| 21 (2017) | Sep 14, 2017 | Assy. Ed Chau | Dunson K. Cheng | Milton Quon | — | Nissan North America Inc. | T.G. Wing Chow, M.D. | Leo Chu | — |
| 22 (2018) | Sep 13, 2018 | Winston and Joanne Young | Dr. Kang L. Wang | — | — | Hong Kong Economic and Trade Office, San Francisco (Note: Excellence in International Partnerships) | Los Angeles Chinatown Corporation | Hong Kong Schools Alumni Federation Scholarship Foundation (Note: Excellence in Philanthropy) | — |
| 23 (2019) | Sep 19, 2019 | Elizabeth Yang | Suellen Cheng | — | — | Morning Light Foundation (Note: Excellence in Global Education) | Linda Liu Sun | Linda Moy | Doré Hall Wong |
| 24 (2020) | Oct 20, 2020 | Judge Dolly Gee | Helen Zia | — | Mei Wah Lau (Note: Community Trailblazer Award) (Note: First female president of the Chinese Consolidated Benevolent Association.) | Los Angeles Times (Note: Societal Transformation Award) | Hilda Solis (Note: Courage in Leadership Award) | — | Jim Jang |
| 24 (2020) | Oct 20, 2020 | Judge Dolly Gee | Helen Zia | — | Asian American Journalists Association–LA Chapter (Note: Advocacy in Action Award) | Los Angeles Times | Renee Tajima-Peña (Note: Champion for Justice Award) | — | Jim Jang |

== See also ==
- History of the Chinese Americans in Los Angeles
- Museum of Chinese in America
- Chinese-American Museum of Chicago
- Chinese American Museum DC
- Chinese American Historical Museum
- Chinese Historical Society of America
- Chinese Historical Society of Southern California
- Weaverville Joss House State Historic Park
- Chinese Culture Center
