= Shanghai Girls =

Novel by Lisa See

- Author: Lisa See
- Language: English
- Genre: Novel
- Publisher: Random House, Inc.
- Publication date: 2009
- Publication place: United States
- Followed by: Dreams of Joy

Shanghai Girls is a 2009 novel by Lisa See. It centers on the complex relationship between two sisters, Pearl and May, as they go through great pain and suffering in leaving war-torn Shanghai, and try to adjust to the difficult roles of wives in arranged marriages and of Chinese immigrants to the U.S. This work marks a return to many of the themes the author addressed in her first major work, On Gold Mountain, a memoir of her family's history. The novel is set between 1937–57 and matches Parts IV and V of the memoir.

The novel received an Honorable Mention from the Asian/Pacific American Awards for Literature. The sequel, Dreams of Joy, was released May 31, 2011.

== Plot summary ==
Shanghai Girls is divided into three parts: Fate, Fortune, and Destiny. Here See treats Chinese immigration from a personal view through Pearl's narration. In On Gold Mountain she objectively placed 100 years of her Chinese family history in the context of the daunting challenges Chinese immigrants faced in coming to America in search of Gold Mountain. America's mistreatment of Chinese immigrants is stressed in both memoir and novel.

The sisters' story is interrelated with critical historical events, famous people, and important places—the Second Sino-Japanese War, the Battle of Shanghai, internment at Angel Island, Los Angeles Chinatown, Hollywood, World War II, the Chinese Exclusion Act, McCarthyism, etc. Historically significant people appearing in the novel include Madame Chiang Kai-shek, actress Anna May Wong, film personality Tom Gubbins, and Christine Sterling, the "Mother of Olvera Street."

Snow Flower and the Secret Fan explores the complex relationship between two intimate friends. In Shanghai Girls See treats the loving yet conflicted relationship between two best friends who also happen to be sisters, especially in the context of their relationship to Pearl's daughter Joy. In speaking of Shanghai Girls, See has commented: "Your sister is the one person who should stick by you and love you no matter what, but she’s also the one person who knows exactly where to drive the knife to hurt you the most." That being said, in Shanghai Girls it is the love of Pearl and May for each other that survives.

=== Characters ===
- Pearl Chin

The protagonist in the story. Her Zodiac sign is the Dragon. The elder of two sisters, she always thought that she was less loved by their parents because of her looks. She is in love with Z.G. Li, a painter/photographer who takes pictures of and paints Pearl and May. Although belonging to a wealthy family, she earns a small amount modelling with her sister, however, this is easily squandered off in her nightlife. She later marries Sam Louie to help pay off her father's debt to the Louies. She and Sam raise Joy, May's child as their own daughter. Later on she becomes pregnant with Sam's baby. She carries the baby to term, but the child is a stillborn boy.

- May Chin

Younger sister of Pearl. Her Zodiac sign is the Sheep. Flirtatious and haughty, she is jealous of her sister who went to college and who she thought was favored by their parents. She has a secret romantic relationship with Z.G. Li. Later it is discovered that she became pregnant by him, resulting in a daughter, Joy. May gives Joy to Pearl to raise as her own daughter because on the night of her wedding to Vern, Sam's brother, she could not bring herself to sleep with him. Father Louie (Vern and Sam's father) might suspect she is pregnant by someone else, so both she and Pearl pretend that Pearl was the one pregnant all along.
