= Snow Flower and the Secret Fan (film) =

- Theatrical release poster
- Directed by: Wayne Wang
- Screenplay by: Angela Workman; Ronald Bass; Michael K. Ray
- Based on: Snow Flower and the Secret Fan by Lisa See
- Produced by: Wendi Murdoch; Florence Sloan
- Starring: Gianna Jun; Li Bingbing; Vivian Wu; Hugh Jackman; Archie Kao
- Cinematography: Richard Wong
- Edited by: Deirdre Slevin
- Music by: Rachel Portman
- Production companies: IDG China Media; Big Feet Productions
- Distributed by: Fox Searchlight Pictures
- Release date: July 15, 2011 (United States)
- Running time: 104 minutes
- Countries: United States; China
- Languages: Mandarin; English; Korean
- Budget: $6 million
- Box office: $11.3 million

Snow Flower and the Secret Fan is a 2011 historical drama film directed by Wayne Wang, based on the 2005 novel written by Lisa See. The film stars Gianna Jun, Li Bingbing, Vivian Wu, Hugh Jackman, and Archie Kao.

== Plot ==
In nineteenth-century China, two girls named Snow Flower (Gianna Jun) and Lily (Li Bing Bing) are forever bonded together as sworn sisters. They are paired as laotong by a matchmaker who is also responsible for arranging their marriages. They are isolated by their families and communicate by writing in a secret sisterly language, Nü shu (a historical practice in China in that period), on a unique Chinese fan that Snow Flower possesses.

Meanwhile, in the present day Shanghai, their descendants Sophia Liao and Nina Wei struggle with the intimacy of their own pure and intense childhood friendship. As teenagers, Sophia and Nina were introduced to the idea of laotong, and they signed a traditional laotong contract on the cover of Canto-pop Faye Wong's album Fu Zao (Restless in English). Faye Wong was their favorite singer and their liberated dancing to the "degenerate" sounds of the cheerful refrain "la cha bor" was one of the reasons Sophia's stepmother attempted to separate them.

Eventually they are separated, but come together again when Sophia falls into a coma after being struck by a taxi while cycling. Reunited at long last, they must come to understand the story of the strong and close ancestral connection hidden from them in the folds of the antique white silk fan, or lose one another forever in the process.

== Cast ==
- Gianna Jun as Sophia/Snow Flower
- Li Bingbing as Nina/Lily
- Vivian Wu as Aunt
- Hugh Jackman as Arthur
- Archie Kao as Sebastian
- Wu Jiang as Butcher
- Angela Evans as Ballroom guest
- Jennifer Lim (voice) as Snow Flower
- Christina Jun (voice) as Sophie

== Production ==
The film was produced by IDG China Media. The filming locations were Hengdian World Studios, Heng Dian, China, and Shanghai, China with many scenes at The Peninsula Hotel on the Bund.

== Distribution ==
Rupert Murdoch personally arranged for the film to be released by Fox Searchlight Pictures, which opened the film in North America on July 15, 2011.

== Reception ==
The film received generally negative reviews from critics. As of June 2020, the film holds a 21% approval rating on Rotten Tomatoes, based on 89 reviews, with an average score of 4.52/10. On Metacritic, it has a score of 42 out of a possible 100, based on 31 reviews.
