= Laotong =

Type of relationship between women found in Chinese culture

Laotong (Chinese: 老同; pinyin: lǎotóng; lit. 'old sames') is a type of relationship in Chinese culture formerly practiced in Hunan that bonded two girls together for eternity as kindred sisters.

== Overview ==
There were two cultural practices in Hunan: Laotong and Laotang, both acknowledging women's social bonds.

Chinese women commonly refer to each other as "Sisters". This is a recognition of the importance of women's supportive relationships, which help them endure hardships over their lives. Marriage preparation might involve a Laotang relationship between several young women; the sisterhood would be dissolved upon marriage. After marriage, new sisterhoods could be formed later between married or widowed women.

For Chinese women, the Laotong or "old-sames" relationship was the strongest and most precious bond of female friendship. This was a rarer and more formal relationship between women. A woman could only have one Laotong, and the intensely unbreakable bond was for life.

Often a Laotong relationship would be formed when a marriage was contracted between families who were expecting babies. This was done before the babies were born. If both children turned out female against the hopes of their families, the daughters could be brought together as Laotong. An intermediary, in some places a matchmaker, would form a Laotong relationship between two girls, similar to an arranged marriage. The Chinese astrological profiles of the girls were considered during the matching process. It was unusual for a Laotong relationship to be broken.

The relationship was made formal by the signing of a contract, which would be done much like a legal contract, using a seal. Laotong would frequently develop a language to use to communicate between them that only they could understand (a type of Nu shu), allowing them to send messages back and forth to one another.

These elements of the Laotong practise are shown in Lisa See's novel Snow Flower and the Secret Fan, which was made into a 2011 movie directed by Wayne Wang.

== See also ==
- Nu shu
- Women in ancient China
- Hunan
- Chinese social relations
- Women's history
- Snow Flower and the Secret Fan
