= Dragon bones (disambiguation) =

Dragon bones or Long gu (龙骨), are fossilized remains of prehistoric life used in traditional Chinese medicine.

Dragon bone(s) may also refer to:

== Fiction ==
- Dragon Bone, a character from the manga Majin Bone
- Dragon Bones (Briggs novel), a 2002 fantasy novel by Patricia Briggs, first instalment of her Hurog series
- Dragon Bones (See novel), a 2003 mystery novel by Lisa See, third instalment of her Red Princess series

== Paleontology ==
- Dinosaur bones
- Dragon Bone Hill, hill in Zhoukoudian, a Chinese archeological site near Beijing, place of the discovery of the Peking Man
- Longgupo (Dragon Bone Slope), a Chinese archeological site near Chongqing where Wushan Man was discovered

== Other uses ==
- 'Dragon Bone Hill', a track from the 1994 album Goodbye to the Age of Steam from band 'Big Big Train'
- Dragon Bones, a 2D skeletal animation solution of the Starling Framework
- Euphorbia lactea, a tropical poisonous shrub, widely grown as an ornamental plant
- Heroes of Might and Magic: Quest for the Dragon Bone Staff, a 2001 video game
