= Posthumous marriage =

Marriage in which at least one of the wed parties is deceased

Posthumous marriage (also known as necrogamy or ghost marriage) is a marriage in which at least one of the participating members is deceased.

== By country ==
=== China ===
In China, there is a rare tradition called minghun or a spirit marriage. This can be performed between two deceased singles, or between a dead person and a living person.

=== France ===
France is one of few countries that cover posthumous marriages in their laws and allow it (Article 171 of French Civil Law). Legal recognition began in 1803 and was intended for war widows. The current legislation was enacted in 1959 following a deadly rupture of the Malpasset Dam, which killed the fiancé of a pregnant woman. This aims to legitimize children born after the death of their father.

=== Germany ===
In Nazi Germany, it was practice to marry the pregnant fiancée of a fallen soldier to his dead body in order to legalise, otherwise out of wedlock, the child and provide the bride with the benefits of a soldier's widow. An example of this is the Norwegian wife of Franz Kutschera.

=== Ireland ===
Irish woman Amanda Teague gained media attention for holding a posthumous marriage ceremony with who she claimed was the ghost of a pirate named Jack Teague, and for later divorcing him.

=== India ===
The Billava community is one of a few in India that practice posthumous marriage. Others that do so include the Badagas, Komatis and the Todas.

=== Japan ===
In Okinawa, which has been under the influences of China for centuries, there was a custom of posthumous marriage. This is done to correct the rules of the placing of spirit tablets. There were strict rules of placing spirit tablets, and if the rules are broken, the spirit tablet under question is moved to a proper place with ceremonies at the order of a spiritualist.

=== South Africa ===
In 2004 a man in South Africa shot his fiancée and then himself during an argument. The two were later married because the families and friends wished to remember them as a happy couple, to marry the families together, and because in African culture death is instead thought of as a separation of body and soul.

=== South Korea ===
In December 1983, Heung Jin Moon, the second son of Sun Myung Moon and Hak Ja Han (who were leaders of the Unification Church), was in an automobile accident in New York and died on January 2. Moon's death came before his planned arranged marriage to ballerina Julia Pak, daughter of Moon's interpreter, Bo Hi Pak. According to Unificationism, only married couples are allowed to enter the highest level of heaven. Moon's parents conducted a posthumous marriage ceremony on February 20, 1984.

In 1982 the fiancée of Duk Koo Kim, a Korean boxer who died of injuries, held a posthumous wedding when a funeral for Kim was conducted in Kim's gym. Kim's fiancée, Lee Yon-mi was three months pregnant with Kim's first child at the time, and wanted to marry the deceased boxer to console him. Lee Yong-mi told Korean media that she would remain celibate for the rest of her life and commit to raising their child. In Korea, it used to be customary for people to marry the soul of a fiancé that died before a planned wedding. The living spouse would then stay celibate for the rest of his or her life, but the tradition is not currently legally binding.

=== South Sudan ===
In Sudan, there is a tradition that when an engaged man dies, his brother replaces him at his wedding, and any of his children are considered children of the deceased brother. Women will marry men to continue their blood line. Women will also marry deceased men so that they can retain their wealth instead of losing it after getting married.

=== United States ===
Necrogamy is not legally recognized in the United States, although there has been at least one wedding-themed funeral.

In 1987, a Venezuelan man died in Florida. The next week, his alleged fiancée told the probate court that she was his wife and claimed the right to administer his estate and that she was entitled to the amount of the estate normally given to a spouse, rather than the entire estate going to his children. Two weeks after the man's death, a Florida court ordered that the alleged marriage be legally recognized. However, this order was reversed the next year, after an appeal by the man's children.

In 2006, Nicole Paultre, fiancée of police shooting victim Sean Bell, tried to posthumously marry him. However, this was not possible because a marriage license had not been signed. Paultre nevertheless took Bell's last name to "honor his memory."

== By religion ==
=== Mormonism ===
Members of the Church of Jesus Christ of Latter-day Saints (LDS Church) believe that, with the appropriate authority, marriages can be performed for "time and all eternity," rather than just "until death do us part." They believe that Jesus gave this authority to the Apostle Peter; in Matthew 16:19, Jesus tells Peter, "And I will give thee the keys of the kingdom of heaven: and whatsoever thou shalt bind on earth shall be bound in heaven: and whatsoever thou shalt loose on earth shall be loosed in heaven." Consequently, the practice of marriage for eternity is referred to as a sealing or an eternal marriage. Sealings can be performed posthumously, as well as for the living. Posthumous sealings can be performed to eternally wed a living person and a deceased spouse (with a live church member standing as a proxy for the deceased), or, more commonly, between two deceased persons (with a living man and woman standing in as proxies). In either case, the couple must have been married while alive. Thus, this practice is perhaps better described as a posthumous sealing rather than a posthumous marriage.

In current practice, men who are dead may be sealed by proxy to all of the women to whom they were legally married while alive. Recent changes in church policy also allow women to be sealed to multiple men, but only after both she and her husbands are dead. Sealings are also performed posthumously for deceased couples, even for couples that divorced in life. This ordinance is similar to the church's practice of baptism for the dead, although it has not been as controversial with non-Mormons.

The church's doctrine is not entirely specific concerning who should be sealed to whom when there are multiple spouses, and the church permits a sealing to take place any time there was a valid marriage between an opposite-sex couple. One possibility is that regardless of how many times a man or woman is sealed, only one marriage will remain in the afterlife. Another possibility is that multiple sealings will be valid in the next life. The church does not clearly teach whether or not polygamous marriages exist in the afterlife. It is believed that the proxy sealings, like the church's proxy baptisms, are offered to the deceased persons and that the deceased persons must accept the ordinance for it to take effect. The LDS Church opposes same-sex marriages and does not perform them for either living or deceased couples.

=== Judaism ===
The Diary of a Young Girl by Anne Frank includes a man named Fritz Pfeffer, under the pseudonym Albert Dussel. In the 1930s Pfeffer met Charlotte Kaletta. Pfeffer and Kaletta moved in together but were forbidden from marrying because of the 1935 Nazi Nuremberg Laws that outlawed marriages between Jews and non-Jews. Kaletta married Pfeffer posthumously in 1950, with retrospective effect to 31 May 1937.

== Posthumous marriage in fiction ==
In Piers Anthony's novel Bearing an Hourglass, the second novel in the Incarnations of Immortality series, a young woman is married to a man who has died in an effort to continue his family line, as any child she conceives will legally be her husband's. In the world the stories are set in, ghosts are not an uncommon sight, but it is noted that in this kind of situation, the bride can never see her ghost husband (and in this case, does not believe he exists).

In Lisa See's novel Peony in Love (New York: Random House, 2007), set in 17th century China, the main character, Peony, dies as a teenager and is later married in a ghost marriage to a poet that she fell in love with during her lifetime.

In Season 2, episode 16 of the television series Bones, a woman was murdered and her bones were sold for a Minhun ghost marriage.

During the final season of the television series Without a Trace, an episode titled “Devotion” featured a young woman who was kidnapped and set to be killed and ghost married by the Chinese parents of her deceased ex-fiancé.

In season 5, episodes 13 of the television series Numb3rs, Chinese women are being murdered and then their bodies are buried atop the coffins of unmarried Chinese males. The brides were picked by the parents of the deceased males. Before the murders, a short traditional wedding ceremony was held so that the deceased sons would have marriage in the afterlife. While it appears that the murders are part of a long-standing tradition, the writers acknowledge that the tradition did not involve murder.

In Elizabeth McCracken's romance The Giant’s House, a librarian named Peggy Cort meets an eleven-year-old boy named James Sweatt, who suffers from a rare disease called Gigantism. Cort develops an obsession with Sweatt, and after his death she conceives a child with his father and claims that it is James's and declares herself as the first posthumous bride in history.

In the film Corpse Bride, a living man accidentally marries a dead woman. When he agrees to remain married to the dead woman, he is told he has to take poison and die (because the marriage vows state "Until death do us part", and death has already parted the living man and the dead woman). Although he agrees to drink the poison and die, they decide it is better for him to marry a living woman (who he was previously engaged to) and remain alive until his natural death. The deceased woman then transforms into a group of white butterflies and flies away into the night.

In Season 2, Episode 20 of The Blacklist, the task force investigates the corpses of Chinese-American women being smuggled out of the country to be sold for "Minhun" ghost marriages. Harf Cheema Punjabi Song "Ehsaas" 2016 Also Example of Ghost Marriage.

== See also ==
- The Maid (2005 film)
- Spirit spouse
- Levirate marriage
