= Gilbert Leong =

Chinese-American architect

Gilbert Lester Leong
- Gilbert and Florence "Sissee" Leong, c. 1943.
- Born: 1910 or 1911
- Died: August 23, 1996 (aged 85); Pasadena, California
- Occupation: Architect
- Spouse: Florence "Sissee" (née See)
- Children: Leslee See Leong
- Buildings: Chinatown's Baptist church; Chinatown's Methodist church; Kong Chow Family Association and Temple; Interior court and authentic Chinese garden in the Pacific Asian Museum in Pasadena

Gilbert Lester Leong (1911-1996) was a Chinese-American architect who designed churches and public buildings in the Los Angeles area. He was the first Chinese-American to graduate from USC with a degree in architecture. His designs helped shape the architecture of postwar Los Angeles and Chinatown. Leong was also a co-founder of the East West Bank in 1973. The bank was set up to serve the Chinese American community in Southern California.

== Education ==
- Leong studied painting and sculpture at Chouinard Art Institute under Millard Sheets
- USC degree in architecture (1936)

== Career ==
After graduating from the University of Southern California with a degree in architecture, Leong worked with architects Paul Williams and Harwell Hamilton Harris. Leong eventually began to work on his own. Leong designed both residential and public buildings in his career. He had an influence on the postwar California architecture of Los Angeles.

=== Exhibitions ===
- In 1936 the work of Leong was featured at the Los Angeles Museum of Contemporary Art. The exhibition was entitled "Oriental Artists".
- In 2012 Steven Wong and Floridia Cheung highlighted Leong's work at the Chinese American Museum in an exhibit called "Breaking Ground", alongside three contemporaneous Chinese American architects active in Los Angeles: Eugene Kinn Choy, Helen Liu Fong, and Gin D. Wong.

=== Designs ===
Selected Chinatown buildings by Gilbert Leong
Name	Image	Year	Address	Notes/Refs.
Chinese United Methodist Church		1947	825 N Hill	
First Chinese Baptist Church		1951	942 Yale	
Kong Chow Family Association and Temple		1960	931 N Broadway	
King Hing Theater		1962	647 N Spring	
Bank of America		1972	850 N Broadway	With Richard Layne Tom
Phoenix Bakery		1977	969 N Broadway	

Other designs by Leong include:

- Tract homes for builder George Ponty in the Ponty-Vanowen (San Fernando Valley) and Ponty-Anaheim developments.
- Homes for Judge Delbert Wong (1954) and Dr. Miguel Tirado (1959) in the Silver Lake neighborhood of Los Angeles.
- Interior court and authentic Chinese garden in the Pacific Asian Museum in Pasadena. Co-designed
- Logo for the Chinese Historical Society of Southern California

== Personal ==
Leong was born in 1911: he was the son of Chinese immigrant parents. He was the first Chinese American to graduate from USC with a degree in architecture. Leong served in the U.S. Army during World War II, and worked for Paul R. Williams after the war. Leong and his family owned the Soochow Restaurant in Los Angeles. Leong co-founded the East West Bank in 1973. Leong died in Pasadena California on August 23, 1996.

Leong married Florence "Sissee" See in 1942; she was the daughter of Chinatown businessman Fong See and the great-aunt of novelist Lisa See, who documented the family's history in her memoir On Gold Mountain at Sissee's request. Leslee Leong, the daughter of Gilbert and Florence, inherited the F. Suie One Co., which had been founded by Fong See.
