= Shark Toof =

American graffiti artist

Shark Toof (born David Lew) is a pseudonymous American graffiti artist, stencillist, muralist, painter and activist, known especially for his use of wheat pasted images of a hand drawn, gape-mouthed great white shark. His work grew out of the California underground graffiti scene and is displayed publicly in urban neighborhoods in several countries and privately in gallery exhibitions. He lives and works in Los Angeles.

Shark Toof creates gritty juxtapositions between animals, most notably sharks, in anachronistic situations. His imagery is rich and multilayered, combining comic and advertising iconography with street art sensibilities. His murals have been used in commercials for Samsung and Apple Inc.

In 2020 he sued the Chinese American Museum for accidentally throwing out his work, but the case was dismissed in court.

Shark Toof is a graduate of ArtCenter College of Design in Pasadena, California.
