= The Interior (novel) =

Book by Lisa See

- Author: Lisa See
- Language: English
- Genre: Novel
- Publisher: HarperCollins
- Publication date: 1999
- Publication place: United States

The Interior is the second novel in Lisa See's Red Princess series. The first is Flower Net and the third is Dragon Bones. In The Interior Chinese MPS inspector Liu Hulan and David Stark, an American attorney who loves her and is the father of her unborn child, try to find out whether Miaoshan, the daughter of Hulan's old friend Suchee, hanged herself or was murdered.

== Plot summary ==
Flower Net ends on March 14, 1997. The setting of The Interior is summer 1997—China "post- Deng Xiaoping", a period characterized by "an unholy alliance between post-Deng Communism ('market socialism') and American capitalism", the China of Jiang Zemin. In the novel the narrator speaks about the times in more personal terms: "As the saying went, the blade of grass points where the wind blows. The only problem was that the wind was blowing in so many directions these days no one could completely protect himself".

The plot centers on the conniving of American and Chinese businessmen to exploit poorly paid Chinese workers, especially women, for profit and power. See describes in great detail the dangers women face because they work in an American toy factory, located in a remote part of the interior of China, that lacks adequate safety protections and is a virtual fire trap. Miaoshan was working at the toy factory before her death. Elisabeth Sherwin quotes Lisa See speaking about the role of Chinese working women from a somewhat different perspective: "'The women making $24 a month in those factories are changing the face of China . . . They are making enough money to open up small stores in their home villages. These women are working at a free market economy and are providing an economic value they never had before.'"

At the end of The Interior Hulan and David solve several murders related to the toy factory. The novel begins with Hulan's friend Suchee and the murder of Miaoshan, her daughter. It concludes with the solution to the mystery of Miaoshan's death (which had nothing to do with the toy factory) and with her mother Suchee working in the fields, unable to forget her.
