= Eugene Kinn Choy =

Chinese-American architect

- Portrait of Eugene Kinn Choy by Julius Shulman (1952); © J. Paul Getty Trust, Getty Research Institute, Los Angeles (2004.R.10).
- Born: March 5, 1912; Guangdong, China
- Died: February 12, 1991 (aged 78)
- Occupation: Architect
- Spouse: Lucille (née Fong)
- Children: Barton, Marilyn
- Practice: Eugene K. Choy and Associates; Choy and McWilliams
- Buildings: Cathay Bank (777 N Broadway)

Eugene Kinn Choy (1912–1991) was a Chinese-American architect best known for designing the Cathay Bank headquarters in Chinatown (1962–66) and several private residences in the Silver Lake neighborhood of Los Angeles. He was the second Chinese-American to join the American Institute of Architects, following I. M. Pei, and one of the earliest to graduate from the School of Architecture at the University of Southern California.

== Early life and family ==
Choy's father, K. C. Choy, emigrated to San Francisco and eventually moved to Bakersfield, California, in 1921, where he started Choy's Department Store (originally named the "City of Fuchau").

Eugene Choy was born March 5, 1912, in Guangdong, China, and emigrated to the United States in approximately 1923, when he was ten. He graduated from Kern County Union High School and Bakersfield Junior College, where he was president of the Architecture Students Association and participated in track competitions. He also served as the art editor for the 1932 Oracle, the high school's yearbook. Later, he attended the University of Southern California, where he received his degree in architecture in 1939. At USC, he was the president of the Chinese Students Club and an amateur photographer. Although he is sometimes credited as the first Chinese-American to graduate from USC with a degree in architecture, he was preceded by peer Chinatown architect and sculptor Gilbert Leong (USC '36).

Choy married Lucille (née Fong) on June 26, 1941, in San Diego, California. During World War II, he worked for the Hughes Aircraft Company, where he assisted in the design of the Spruce Goose.

Choy was one of the first non-white residents of the Silver Lake neighborhood of Los Angeles due to racial covenants in effect prohibiting the sale of property to "any person not of the Caucasian race" when he sought to build a house for his family there. He went door to door to seek the approval of every house in the neighborhood before he was given approval to build in 1949, opening the door to the Asian American and Latino communities in the 1950s and 1960s

Choy's brother Lawrence also trained as an architect; a third brother, Allan (1920–2004), graduated from USC in 1948 with an architecture degree. Lawrence later took over the family business in Bakersfield, Choy's Department Store, from his father; Eugene helped to redesign the storefront and interior in 1948 and again for a grand reopening in 1953 following the 1952 Kern County earthquake.

Choy's son Barton also trained as an architect; Barton designed neighboring houses in Silver Lake for himself and his sister Marilyn.

== Career ==
Choy first received local recognition for his sketches in the early 1930s. One of Choy's fifth-year projects at USC was featured in The Architect and Engineer for April 1939.

Before he received his architect's license in May 1947 and opened his own office in Los Angeles that July, Choy worked for architects in southern California, including Stanton Willard and Francis W. Wynkoop. He hired Helen Liu Fong as a secretary after she graduated from the University of California at Berkeley in 1949. Early commissions included the family business (1808 19th St, 1948) and Temple Beth-El (2906 Loma Linda Dr, 1949), both in Bakersfield.

After Barton joined his father's practice in 1972, the firm was renamed to Choy Associates; it later was renamed to Cordova Architects in 2013 to reflect the current ownership.

=== Exhibitions ===
In 2012 Steven Wong and Floridia Cheung highlighted Choy's work alongside contemporary peer architects Helen Fong, Gilbert Leong, and Gin D. Wong at the Chinese American Museum in an exhibit called "Breaking Ground", citing their collective influence on modern Los Angeles architecture.

=== Designs ===
Selected Chinatown buildings by Eugene Kinn Choy
Name	Image	Year	Address	Notes/Refs.
Ying On Benevolent Association		1949	424 W Bernard	
Gee How Oak Tin Association		1949	421 Bernard	
Wong Kong Har Wu Sun Association		1950	744 N Broadway	
Chinese Consolidated Benevolent Association		1951	925 N Broadway	
Jin Hing Jewelry Store		1955	412 Bamboo Ln	
Chinese American Citizens Alliance		1955	415 Bamboo Ln	
Kwong Medical Center		1955	1029 N Broadway	
Cathay Bank		1966	777 N Broadway	Cathay Bank was founded in 1962 by F. Chow Chan, owner of the Phoenix Bakery.
Castelar Street Elementary School		1977	840 Yale	Choy designed the large addition, completed in 1977.

Choy notably designed several buildings within the New Chinatown district of Los Angeles. Outside of Chinatown, Choy designed a research laboratory for the Ramo-Wooldridge Corporation near Los Angeles International Airport (1957, 5730 Arbor Vitae).

Aside from his commercial/public work, Choy was noted for designing residences in the Silver Lake neighborhood of Los Angeles, including:

- Eugene Kinn Choy House (personal residence, 1949, 3027 Castle St/3028 Windsor Ave) According to his son Barton, Choy had to seek permission from neighbors and build the house before securing a loan because of racial restrictions in the neighborhood. The house was photographed by Julius Shulman and written up for Arts & Architecture in February 1951.
- Chew House (1953, 3893 Franklin Ave), built for another Chinese-American architect.
- 3200 Windsor Ave (1954)
- Kawaguchi House (1955–56, 3022 Windsor Ave), featured in Season 2 of the television show You as the house of the character Love Quinn (Victoria Pedretti).
- 2352–2356 W Duane St (1957, apartments)

In addition, Choy designed the Brander House in the Hollywood Hills (1959, 7266 Outpost Cove Drive).
