= Golden Days (novel) =

1987 novel by Carolyn See

- First edition cover
- Author: Carolyn See
- Language: English
- Subject: Nuclear warfare
- Genre: Fiction
- Published: 1987
- Publication place: United States
- Media type: Print (hardcover)
- Pages: 196
- ISBN: 9780070561205
- OCLC: 13270958

Golden Days is a novel by Carolyn See about a middle-aged divorcee and single mother who moves to Southern California and lives the California dream until the nuclear bombs fall.

== Plot ==
"In the early eighties, you had the sense that there was nothing you couldn't do in L.A."

In Golden Days, Edith Langley, a 38-year-old divorcee returns to Los Angeles from the East Coast with her two daughters, Aurora and Denise, to start a new life in 1980. They move into a home in Topanga Canyon, and Edith reinvents herself as a financial reporter and then a financial advisor to other women. Edith begins a relationship with Skip Chandler, an older married man. Skip is back in the States for a medical issue—his wife and children still in Argentina where they moved after the Cuban Missile Crisis. Edith and Skip live the affluent life of the 1980s in Southern California—money, Lear Jets, and Porsches. They fly to San Francisco to attend a weekend seminar given by Lion Boyce on "Abundance as a Natural State." At the seminar, Edith runs into an old friend—Lorna McAvey. On their return, Skip goes to the doctor and discovers there is nothing wrong with him. The novel then flashes back to 1962 when Edith meets her friend Lorna—who sees her through the years of her first marriage and divorce. The story then returns to L.A. in the early eighties; Edith grows a business as a gem dealer and banker. Edith and Lorna are friends again—Edith refers to it as their second friendship. Edith fills Lorna in on her second failed marriage to Dirk Langley, an Australian surf film director. As Edith becomes richer and richer, Lorna reinvents herself on television preaching the positive message of abundance. The book then jumps forward to 1986, by which time Edith's eldest daughter has graduated from college and is a successful international courier while her younger daughter is still at home and in school. Edith and Skip have settled into a quiet life entrenching themselves through their affluence against an increasingly unsettled world focusing on the younger daughter's school. A war begins in Central America. At the school, Edith and Lorna meet Franz deGeld a Hollywood executive whom Lorna is having an affair. At that time, a Nuclear bomb goes off in a Central American jungle killing a few thousand people. Life goes on as before. Aurora has fallen in love and announces she is marrying Skip's son Deeky and moving with him to South America. Skip gives them a house in La Plata.

The next part of the novel takes a bit of a break from the main plot and deals with a period of waiting for something bad to happen. Characters talk about fear. One chapter focuses on the life of a cheating husband.

The final part of the novel is nuclear annihilation and its aftermath. Edith describes the last days and Lorna's continued preaching against fear. Then the bomb hits and Edith, Skip, her daughter Denise live through the blast, subsequent fires, illness and disfigurement. The novel describes the lives of the family, friends, and neighbors as they attempt to survive in this new wasteland. The remaining characters decide to leave the Canyon to walk down to the Beach. As they go Edith begins to tell stories—affirming stories, not unlike those of her friend Lorna and Lion Boyce.

"There will be those who say that the end came, I mean the END, with an avenging God and the whole shebang. And many more who say it came, and there was death and terror, and weeping in the streets, and the last man on earth died in the Appalachians, of pancreatic cancer, all alone. I heard that story, and I don't think much of it. You can believe what you want to, of course. But I say there was a race of hardy laughers, mystics, crazies, who knew their real homes, or who had been drawn to this gold coast for years, and they lived through the destroying light, and on, into the Light Ages."

== Major themes ==
There are many themes running through Golden Days. Themes include nuclear holocaust, dreams of wealth, security and love promised by life in the suburbs, Cold War politics, New Age eccentricity, the California Dream, greed, narcissism, out-of-control capitalism, racism, and the dream of Eden.

== Development history ==
The idea for the novel came to Carolyn See after watching televised interviews about War right after the Russians invaded Afghanistan. See decided to write the novel with the lives of Samuel Pepys and John Evelyn during the Great Plagues in mind—those who lived their normal lives while others died around them. She constructed the lives of the characters close to her own—like her the heroine was a divorced, working mother of two daughters and she modeled other characters on her friends and neighbors. She chose to focus on the affluent lifestyle of California during that time.

See stated that she structured the novel like an atomic bomb. The first part shows the heroine living in an "easy" plot establishing her life in Southern California. Then that story is ended with a blip—not unlike the blip halfway up a nuclear explosion. This blip is a nuclear incident in Southern Mexico, which then turns the focus of the novel on essays and meditations with the theme of "waiting around." Part Three of the book is the aftermath of the blast itself—the death of civilization, the fires, the radiation and the survival of the heroine, her family, and neighbors.

See said the first draft was 465 pages that she whittled down to around 199 in the final form. See stated that she wanted those pages to "burn like a waffle iron." While it is often grouped with science fiction novels—See views the genre as social realism.

See was 11 years old when the bomb was dropped on Hiroshima and her father left home two weeks later. According to the New York Times Book Review interview with See—a bomb was dropped in two separate ways in her life, and she began from then on to have nightmares about the bomb. In the same interview See said that she wanted to persuade people about the possibility of nuclear war and that the thinking about the unthinkable shouldn't be left to the right-wing.

=== Publication history ===
- 1987, United States, McGraw-Hill ISBN 0070561206, 1987, hardcover
- 1987, United States, Fawcett Books ISBN 0449214370, 1987, mass market paperback
- 1989, United Kingdom, Arrow Books Ltd ISBN 0099617609, 1989, paperback
- 1996, United States, University of California Press ISBN 9780520206731, 1996, trade paperback

=== Explanation of the novel's title ===
The title Golden Days is a reference to Book III of Paradise Lost. The quote from John Milton is:

The world shall burn, and from her ashes spring
New Heaven and Earth, wherein the just shall dwell
And after all their tribulations long
See golden days ...

== Literary significance and reception ==
Initial reception by major critical outlets was positive and since that time Golden Days has begun to be seen as a significant work of California fiction.

In The New York Times Book Review in 1986, Carol Sternhell described the book as See's fifth and best book. Sternhell stated that in a weird was way, it may be the most life-affirming novel she had read. Publishers Weekly called the book an entirely new voice for See and described it as if John Cheever changed gender and moved to California.

The University of California Press re-published the title in 1996 as part of a series called California Fiction. The back of the publication states that the California Fiction titles are selected for their "literary merit and their illumination of California history and culture."

David Seed, in his book American Science Fiction and the Cold War, compared See's book to other nuclear holocaust titles where male writers focused on the End. He compares the narration in See's book to others in the genre and found, "Narration thereby becomes an extended act of determination, not to flee Los Angeles, not to yield to despair and not to recognize the local beach as the site of extinction. The beach actually comes alive with more survivors than expected who then listen to her story. Even the conclusion to See's novel continues the dialogue between the accounts of others 'who say that the end came' and her narrator's insistence on continuity to into a future.

Writer Gabrielle Zevin reviewed Golden Days on NPR in 2012 as part of a segment called You Must Read This, and said that she was assigned the book as part of a class on California Fiction given by William Handley. Zevin praises its ability to shift genres from contemporary fiction to science fiction Zevin states that it is the one novel that convinced her that contemporary fiction is worth reading and writing.
