= The Island of Sea Women =

2019 novel by Lisa See

- Author: Lisa See
- Language: English
- Genre: Novel
- Publisher: Scribner
- Publication date: 2019
- Publication place: United States
- Pages: 374

The Island of Sea Women is a 2019 historical novel written by American author Lisa See. Set on the Korean island of Jeju, the novel tells the story of a friendship between Mi-ja, the daughter of a Japanese collaborator, and Young-Sook, the heir apparent in a family of haenyeo. Throughout the decades from Japanese rule to the modern era, the two become close but find their relationship strained as a result of their backgrounds.

See researched haenyo and visited South Korea to interview some of the women divers for the novel.

== Plot summary ==
The story alternates between five historical parts narrated from Young-Sook's point of view and interludes set in 2008, where an older Young Sook meets Mija's descendants. The primary characters are haenyeo, all-female free divers who harvest sea creatures such as abalone and sea urchins from the ocean floor. The women are the primary providers who control the money, but their husbands still inherit land and perform ancestor worship.

Young Sook and Mija are lifelong friends who live on the volcanic island of Jeju, in the village of Hado. From 1910 to 1945, Korea was brutally ruled by Japan, and Koreans who worked for the colonial government were known as collaborators. Young-Sook is the daughter of a respected haenyeo chief while Mija is the orphaned daughter of a collaborator. As a result, Mija is seen as an outcast and abused by her aunt and uncle. Young-sook's mother takes her on as a surrogate daughter, letting her dive with their haenyeo collective, and the two become best friends.

In 1938, on their first dive, fifteen-year-old Young-Sook gets into an accident with Yu-ri, the daughter of her mother's best friend Do-saeng. Yu-ri greedily chases after octopus and is nearly killed; after being in a coma for weeks, she can no longer speak or function independently. Young-sook feels guilty and thinks that Do-saeng holds her responsible. Young-sook's mother is shaken by the accident; when Young-sook captures her first abalone, her mother becomes caught underwater and drowns.

Do-saeng becomes chief of the collective and treats Young-sook coldly. Now the primary breadwinner for her family, Young-sook travels abroad to dive; Mi-ja always accompanies her. In 1944, the pair return home ready for marriage. On the deck, they meet Sang-mun, a wealthy and handsome Korean man whose father is a collaborator. Young-sook is immediately smitten with him, but he is more interested in Mi-ja. Mi-ja suddenly becomes afraid and withdrawn, while Young-sook is distraught to discover that two of her brothers were conscripted by the Japanese army and her father is an alcoholic.

Young-sook's grandmother arranges marriages for both girls. Mi-ja is given to Sang-mun and taken to live in Jeju City. Young-sook is married to Jun-bu, the son of Do-saeng and brother of Yu-ri, who is a student. Although she feels disappointed at first, Young-sook and Jun-bu fall in love. Meanwhile, Sang-mun abuses Mi-ja and completely controls her. While their husbands are abroad, the two women go on another diving expedition, where they give birth to their first children together. By the time they return to Jeju, the Japanese are losing WWII, and Korea is partitioned by the Soviet Union and America, leaving the people feeling like they have been colonized again.

Young-sook and Jun-bu move to the village of Bukchon, where he is a teacher. Young-sook joins the local diving collective, grows her family, and takes care of Yu-ri. The Americans control Jeju's government and puts former collaborators, including Sang-mun, in charge. Their leaders are fervently anticommunist and rightwing; anyone who disagrees with them is labeled a communist and can be arrested, shot, and killed along with their entire family. As a teacher, Jun-bu is seen as a leftist troublemaker. The family attends rallies and protests for free elections and democracy, including the Sam-il Demonstrations and February 1948 General Strike. The anti-communist government increasingly cracks down, banning any form of dissent.

In 1948, the 4.3 Incident occurs. Rebels storm and attack Jeju police stations, leading to anti-communist purges. Everyone is forced to move to the coast or be shot, creating a massive refugee crisis and food shortages. Young-sook and Mi-ja remain friends, but Young-sook is wary because their husbands are on opposite sides.

Everything comes to a head in the Bukchon massacre. In revenge for the killing of two soldiers, the army rounds up the entire village and kills 300-400 people. As a collaborator's wife, Mi-ja has protection; Young-sook begs her to take at least one of her children, but Mi-ja does nothing when Sang-mun comes to retrieve her. Jun-bu, Yu-ri, and Young-sook's firstborn son are brutally killed. From then on, Young-sook sees her as a collaborator and traitor.

After the massacre, Young-sook and her surviving children escape to Hado, their hometown. She gives birth to her last child, Joon-lee, a bright and curious girl who takes after her father. Young-sook eventually becomes chief of the diving collective and participates in scientific studies on the haenyeo. Under an authoritarian dictatorship, any acknowledgement of the massacres or association with suspected communists can lead to arrest and death. Joon-lee gets the opportunity to attend private school in Seoul, where she falls in love with Yo-Chan. It is revealed that Young-sook's family was tainted by the guilt-by-association system; Mi-ja used her connections to help Joon-lee get into school and looked out for her. Despite the years that have passed, Young-sook believes the worst of her old friend and refuses to attend Joon-lee and Yo-chan's wedding. Joon-lee and Yo-chan eventually move to America, where she gives birth to a daughter, Clara's mother, before dying of cancer.

In 2008, an American family visits Young-sook on the beach near her home. It is revealed that the mother, Janet, is Joon-lee and Yo-chan's daughter. Janet's daughter, Clara, pesters Young-sook with questions. At a memorial for the victims of the Buchkon massacre, Clara finally convinces Young-sook to listen to Mi-ja's side of the story in the form of audio tapes. Mi-ja confessed to her great-granddaughter that Sang-mun raped her when they first met; they were forced into marriage, where he constantly abused her and their son. During the massacre, she was afraid to take Young-sook's children into his home because of his cruelty, but she deeply regrets never intervening. Young-sook finally chooses to forgive Mi-ja and acknowledge the ways she failed to support her while treasuring their friendship and shared descendants. The book ends with her teaching Janet and Clara the ways of the haenyeo.
