= Flower Net =

1997 novel by Lisa See

- Author: Lisa See
- Language: English
- Genre: Novel
- Publisher: HarperCollins
- Publication date: 1997
- Publication place: United States

Flower Net (1997) by Lisa See is the first of the Red Princess mysteries. The other two novels in the series are The Interior (1999) and Dragon Bones (2003). Flower Net explores the state of US-China relations in the early months of 1997, especially in terms of international politics, human trafficking, and the smuggling of illegal goods such as bear bile, and nuclear trigger devices. It also focuses on human relationships – especially those between father and son, father and daughter. Pam Spencer suggests that the title refers to "the flower net used by Chinese fishermen who throw the mesh wide to trap everything within its reach".

== Plot summary ==
The time frame for Flower Net is January 10, 1997 – March 14, 1997. The main narrative ends February 13, 1997—just before the death of Deng Xiaoping on February 19. Much of the story involves flashbacks to the Cultural Revolution (1966–1976) and its traumatic impact on the lives of a great number of people. The novel's key characters are Liu Hulan, inspector in the Ministry of Public Security and a Red Princess, and David Stark, Assistant U.S. Attorney, who loves her. Gary Krist writes that "Hulan is a provocative mixture of vulnerability, bitterness and hardheaded practicality," a survivor of the Cultural Revolution who has learned that survival means hiding her emotions from the outside world.

The book begins with the murders of two young men, one the son of the U.S. ambassador to China and the other the son of one of the richest and most powerful men in China. For reasons not clear to Hulan and David, the Chinese and American governments come to the unusual agreement that the two should jointly investigate the murders. Their initial assumption is that the killings must be related to the Rising Phoenix, a criminal gang operating in both China and Los Angeles. The case is complicated because Hulan and David have previously been lovers, and each is devoted to his or her country. See also describes Vice Minister Liu and his frosty relationship with Hulan, his daughter.

Near the end of the novel seven gruesome murders are solved. Although the young men of the Rising Phoenix are indeed involved, the murderer hounding Hulan and David is revealed to be Hulan's father, Vice Minister Liu, who has been consumed by greed and the desire for revenge, mistakenly blaming his daughter for the hard time he served in a Chinese work camp early in the Cultural Revolution and for the serious injuries his wife, Hulan's mother, suffered during the same period.

The narrative concludes with Hulan's thoughts of the coming spring and her anticipation of the birth of her first child.
