= Dreams of Joy =

2011 novel by Lisa See

- Author: Lisa See
- Cover artist: Lynn Buckley (design); Ruby Levesque (design); Vincent Lexington Harper (illustration)
- Language: English
- Genre: Novel
- Publisher: Random House, Inc.
- Publication date: 2011
- Publication place: United States
- Pages: 354
- Preceded by: Shanghai Girls

Dreams of Joy is a 2011 novel by Lisa See. It debuted as #1 in the New York Times list of best selling fiction. In this book See completes the circle she began in Shanghai Girls. See's novel uses Mao's China as her background, but her story focuses on the change and growth of her main characters – Pearl, Joy, Z.G., and May. Susan Salter Reynolds suggests that “it’s a story with characters who enter a reader’s life, take up residence, and illuminate the myriad decisions and stories that make up human history.”

== Plot ==
Dreams of Joy is organized in four sections—The Tiger Leaps, The Rabbit Dodges, The Dog Grins, and The Dragon Rises. Joy is the Tiger – romantic, artistic, rash, and impulsive. In this novel, unlike Shanghai Girls, Joy and Pearl are both narrators. Driven by anger at Pearl and May for lying to her about her identity and filled with guilt because of her role in Sam's death, Joy hastily leaves Los Angeles Chinatown to find her biological father Z.G. and to join the new Chinese society. Finding her father rather quickly in Shanghai, Joy goes with him to a village collective where he is forced to teach art to the peasants. Joy throws herself enthusiastically into the life of the collective and into a hasty marriage with Tao, a peasant artist. Only through motherhood and terrible suffering is Joy able to find her true identity and to exorcise her inner demons. See has written about the difficulty she faced in developing Joy's character: “At first, Joy was hard to write about because she’s so naïve and stubborn. She makes such terrible mistakes, which, as a mother and her writer, I found hard to watch. . . But what an experience it was to watch her go through all the terrible things she experiences and see her grow up to be a wonderful artist and courageous mother.”

Z.G. is the Rabbit, frequently hopping away from danger. Although close to Mao himself, the Chairman can't trust the artist because of his individualistic streak and Western influences. Z.G. has to go to the country as a form of punishment for his subversive tendencies. What brings Z.G. through in the end are his art, his growing love for Joy and his granddaughter Samantha, his friendship with Pearl, and his devotion to May.

The Dog is Tao, the village artist who Joy marries. As Pearl sees it, the question is what kind of Dog will Tao turn out to be. “’A Dog can be violent. . . Is he the kind of Dog you can trust and love, or will he bite you’”. Unfortunately Joy’s passionate view of Tao as a good Dog turns out to be false. Tao is a poor husband, an indifferent father, and a young man devoted to seeking the main chance, no matter who he has to step over to reach his goals. Even surviving the most desperate of circumstances does not change Tao's character.

Pearl is the Dragon. She is the second narrator of Dreams of Joy and the character See found easiest to write. “I was already so familiar with Pearl’s strengths and weaknesses from Shanghai Girls. Her words just flowed, because I’ve now lived with her every day for over four years. In Shanghai Girls Mama speaks frequently of Pearl's Dragon nature -- and does so even when she is dying: "'There was a typhoon the day you were born... It is said that a Dragon born in a storm will have a particularly tempestuous fate. You always believe you are right, and this makes you do things you shouldn't... You're a Dragon, and of all the signs only a Dragon can tame the fates. Only a Dragon can wear the horns of destiny, duty and power'". Mama's mother love in giving up her life for her daughters becomes the standard by which Pearl judges herself.

If Dreams of Joy is the story of Joy's coming of age, it also describes Pearl's growth through love, courage, and self-sacrifice. She pursues Joy to a China she never knew, living in her old Shanghai home as just another boarder, earning a living by collecting papers, and trying desperately to reconnect with her daughter. If such a pursuit requires painful patience and hard work at a collective farm, so be it. Like her mother before her, Pearl is willing to give up everything to save Joy and her granddaughter Samantha from death. Despite such trials, Pearl endures to the end to find joy in her daughter and granddaughter, friendship in Z.G., a new love with Dun the professor, and reaffirmation of her enduring bond with May. Little wonder that Pearl is radiant at novel's end.

As for May the Sheep, See keeps her offstage for almost the entire novel. She is constantly present, however, through her letters to Pearl and the money and gifts she sends to her sister and Joy. At home May endures much hardship -- especially in the context of the death of her husband Vern. Only when Vern dies does May understand the suffering Pearl experienced after Sam's death. She is also tormented by Pearl's refusal to tell her the state of her relationship with Z.G. Nevertheless, in the end May finds the love she has been seeking her entire life.

== Themes ==
Of See's themes, Jane Glenn Haas writes: "Basically, Lisa See writes about families. Love themes. Mothers and daughters. Children and parents. Romance. Love of country. Of place. The story itself must be so strong, so enthralling, the history helps it to play out." See herself adds: "One of the things I'm most proud of in this book is that it is a real coming-of-age novel. . . Joys grows up and gets to know herself." One of the ways Joy finds herself is through her art, inspired in part by her father Z.G., a famous painter. According to Malena Watrous, "This is a novel about living with the consequences of bad decisions, which we all make, about how both forgiveness and growth arise from mistakes." It deals with "people who often take wrong turns to their own detriment but for the good of the story, leading to greater strength of character and more durable relationships."

== Development ==
Although not originally intending to write a sequel to Shanghai Girls, See is now glad she did. "I got to continue the story of Pearl, May, and Joy. I learned so much about them and about myself in the process. Most important, I got to give the characters a happy ending. I loved that!"
