= Amanda Teague =

Irish pirate impersonator

- Born: Amanda Large
- Known for: Posthumous marriage, pirate impersonator

Amanda Sparrow Large Teague, born Amanda Large, is an Irish and Northern Irish pirate impersonator and asexual rights activist who worked as the only female Jack Sparrow impersonator in Northern Ireland. She became known for her posthumous marriage ceremony to Captain Jack Teague, who she claims was a pirate who died in the 1700s and the inspiration for Jack Sparrow. She made further news upon her revelation that she posthumously divorced him. She has since come out as asexual and run an organization for asexual people in Belfast.

== Career ==
She spent time in Drogheda, but moved from Drogheda to Belfast in 2009. She worked as a publicist and entertainment manager until the death of her son at just three months old. Not long after, she found herself fascinated by Jack Sparrow and impersonated him for Belfast Pride. Following that, she fully transformed herself into Sparrow and worked as a Jack Sparrow impersonator. At this point, she also changed her name to make it Amanda Large Sparrow.

She claims to have first met Jack Teague when he appeared in her bed in 2014. She stated that she was meditating at the time, and that she asked him to leave, but he came back. She has claimed that he is the ghost of a Haitian pirate from the 1700s that was executed for piracy. After two years of dating, in 2016, she created a marriage ceremony for them, getting married in international waters and using a medium to state I do. Although she has claimed that the marriage was legal, fact-checkers such as Snopes have stated that it was not legally valid.

She announced that the two had split up months later. She later claimed that Jack Teague had "never accepted his own death, so he wanted to continue living through my body". Eventually, she clarified that she began feeling ill health just two weeks after the ceremony, which she believed he may have caused, and became more worried after the spirit of her dog, Toby, was allegedly aggressive to Jack. Soon, she was admitted to a hospital with sepsis. During surgery, she had to remove her wedding ring, and she has claimed this broke the connection. Eventually, she claims she told him she wanted to break up, and after he got aggressive and threatened to kill her, she exorcised him.

She calls herself a "white witch". She has discussed receiving online abuse after telling her story. She has also stated she has no mental health problems.

Excalibur Press published her first book, A Life You Will Remember, in 2017. In it, she alleges she is Ireland's only modern-day pirate. She published her second book, A New Attitude, in 2019.

== Personal life ==
In 2018, she publicly came out as asexual, stating that she had struggled with her sexuality from a young age, and wrote an essay about asexuality for the Rainbow Project. She ran an organization for asexual people called Ace Belfast.
