= Gin D. Wong =

American architect (1922–2017)

Gin Dan Wong
- Born: September 17, 1922; Guangzhou, China
- Died: September 1, 2017 (aged 94); Los Angeles, California, U.S.
- Education: University of Southern California
- Known for: Architecture
- Spouse: Louise Wong
- Website: gwa-architects.com

Gin Dan Wong (September 17, 1922 – September 1, 2017) was a Chinese-born American architect based in Los Angeles, California. During his career, he was the chief of the Architectural Guild for the School of Architecture and Fine Arts at University of Southern California, the founder and chairman of Gin Wong Associates, and the president of William L. Pereira Associates.

== Background and education ==
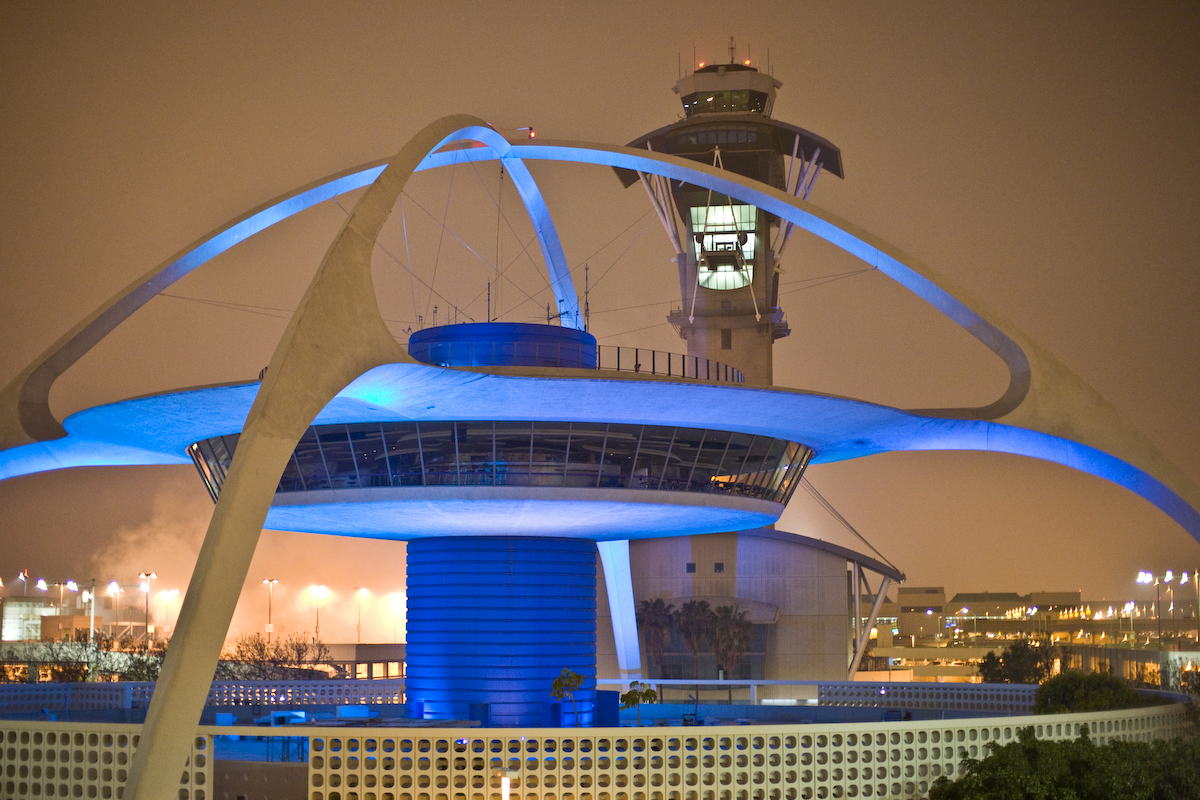
Gin Wong designed the Los Angeles Airport's theme building

Wong was born in Guangzhou, China, one of nine children. His parents immigrated to the United States during the Great Depression. He pursued coursework in engineering at Los Angeles City College in 1942. Wong then served in the US Army Air Corps during World War II, as a B-29 navigator in the Pacific. Upon returning to the United States, he attended Millikin University, in Decatur, Illinois, and later completed his B. Arch. from the University of Southern California in 1950.

After graduating, he joined the firm of Pereira & Luckman, and then later joined William L. Pereira Associates when the firm split in 1958. At William L. Pereira he would go on to become a designer, then director of design, and eventually president. According to the Los Angeles Times, "as a member of the Pereira firm Wong said he had major roles in the design of many West Coast buildings, including Occidental Center, Crocker Bank, Mutual Benefit Life and the new tower of St. Francis Hotel in San Francisco," as well as the Transamerica Pyramid. Wong also designed the monumental facades of the Robinson's department stores in Santa Barbara and Newport Beach. In 1974, Wong left William L. Pereira Associates to start his own firm, Gin Wong Associates.

In the years before his death, Wong was recognized by the Pacific Standard Time initiative of the Getty Center, as an influential Chinese American architect of Los Angeles. Their exhibition Breaking Ground: Chinese American Architects in Los Angeles (1945-1980) at the Chinese American Museum showcased Wong's work alongside that of Eugene K. Choy, Helen Liu Fong, and Gilbert L. Leong.

== Works and significance ==
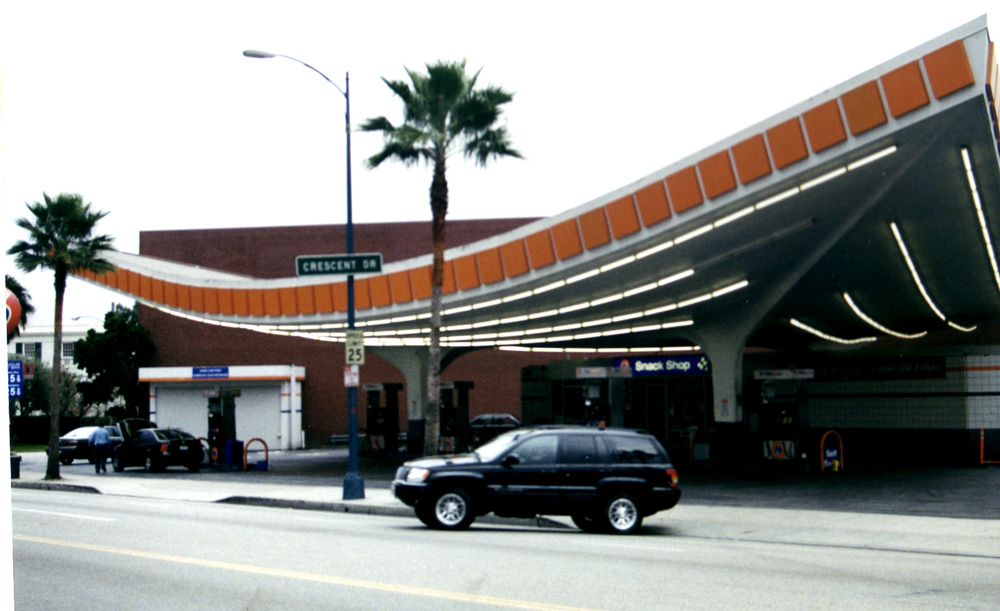
The 76 gas station in Beverly Hills is among Wong's "most beloved and enduring".

Wong was known as the designer of numerous buildings and centers in Southern California and the Pacific Rim: LAX Theme Building; the Atlantic Richfield Company (ARCO) Headquarters Building in Downtown Los Angeles; the Columbia Broadcasting System Television City; the Crean Tower and Mary Hood Chapel on the Crystal Cathedral campus; the Jack Colker's 76 Station in Beverly Hills; Hyatt Regency International Airport in Incheon, Korea; and the Pan Pacific Tower in Honolulu, Hawaii.

According to ArchDaily, Gin Wong had "a long history with the development of Los Angeles’s built environment. He was pivotal in the design of the original Los Angeles International Airport, developing a satellite system that moved arrivals, departures and baggage terminals efficiently – a system now considered the blueprint for airport design. His work is known for blending technological innovations with practical design."

== Honors ==
- Lifetime Achievement Award, USC Architecture, 2019
- Architectural Design Leadership Award, Asian Business Association, 1999
- Fellow, American Institute of Architects, 1966
- Producer's Council Design Award, University of Southern California, 1950
