= Carolyn See =

American novelist and journalist (1934–2016)

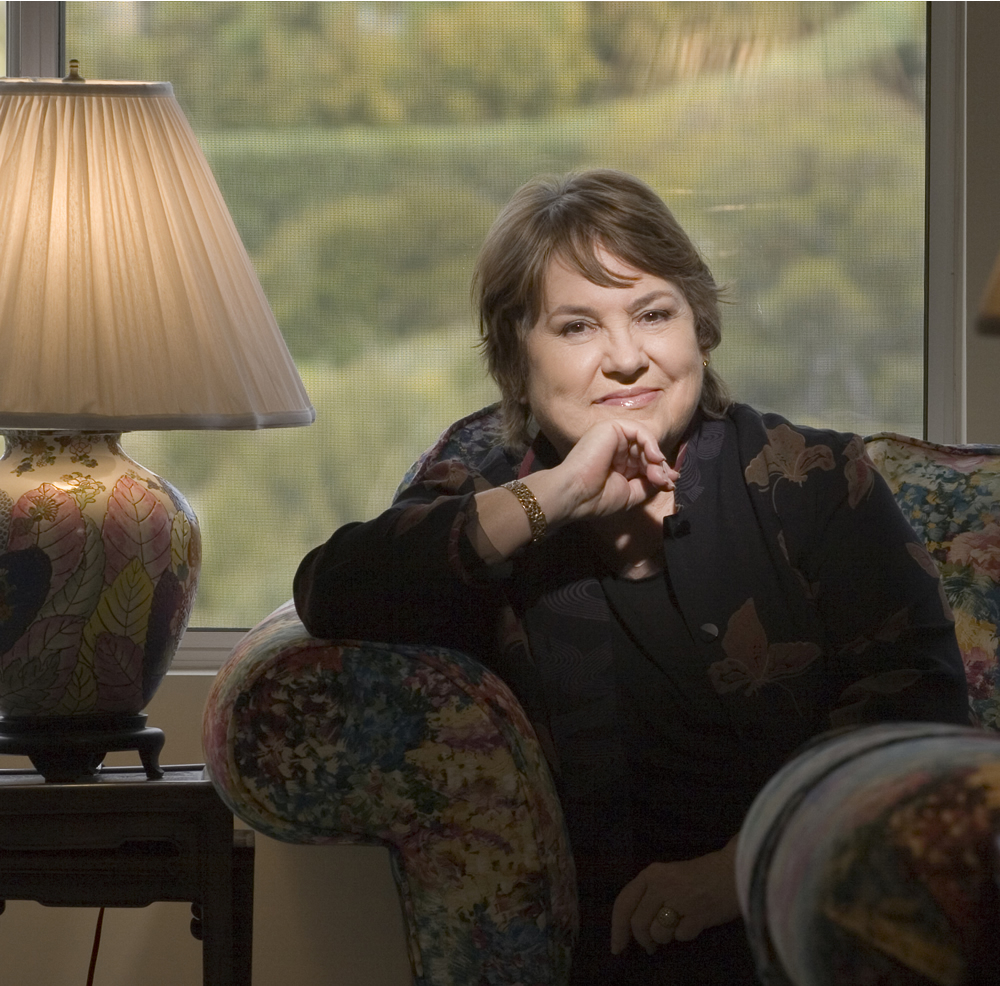
- Born: Caroline Laws; January 13, 1934; Pasadena, California, U.S.
- Died: July 13, 2016 (aged 82); Santa Monica, California, U.S.
- Occupations: Novelist; professor; critic
- Spouses: Richard See (m. 1954; div. 1959) Tom Sturak (m. 1960; div. 1969)
- Children: 2, including Lisa See

Carolyn See (née Laws; January 13, 1934 – July 13, 2016) was a professor emerita of English at the University of California, Los Angeles, and the author of ten books, including the memoir, Dreaming: Hard Luck and Good Times in America, an advice book on writing, Making a Literary Life, and the novels There Will Never Be Another You, Golden Days, and The Handyman. See was also a book critic for The Washington Post for 27 years.

== Early life and education ==
On January 13, 1934, Caroline Laws was born in Pasadena, California, to Kate Louise Sullivan Daly and George Laws. Her father was a would-be novelist and occasional journalist. She spent her early years in Eagle Rock, California. Her father abandoned them when she was eleven and she was raised by her mother whom she described as a mean alcoholic. Her mother eventually remarried and got pregnant, and 16-year-old Caroline was sent to live with her father and stepmother in Los Angeles. Her half-sister struggled with addiction and eventually died from heroin.

She earned her associate degree from Los Angeles City College. During her second year at City College, she married Richard See and moved with him to Newfoundland where he was mustered for the Korean War. When they returned to L.A., See earned her M.A. from California State University, Los Angeles and gave birth to her first daughter, Lisa See. See won the Samuel Goldwyn Creative Writing Contest in 1958 for her unpublished novel The Waiting Game and used the $250 prize money to pay for her divorce from Richard See. See later finished her doctorate at UCLA and her dissertation was on the Hollywood novel.

== Career ==
In the late 1960s See began writing articles for the Los Angeles Times and celebrity profiles for TV Guide. At this time See worked out her writing habit—one thousand words a day on white unlined paper in felt pens. While writing non-fiction articles and reviews, See was approached by Little, Brown editor Harry Sions who encouraged her to write a novel which became The Rest is Done with Mirrors.

See's first teaching job was as a professor of English at Loyola Marymount University from 1970 until 1985. This was followed by a period as a visiting professor of English at her alma mater, UCLA, from 1986 to 1989, where she would later become an adjunct professor. See also earned money by testifying for the defense in pornography trials, leading to the successful book Blue Money: Pornography and the Pornographers.

Besides writing, See also contributed to the literary world through reviews, and sat on review boards for awards. See was a frequent book reviewer for The Washington Post having previously been a book reviewer for the Los Angeles Times and Newsday. See retired from the Washington Post in 2014 after 27 years. She had been on the boards of the National Book Critics Circle and PENWest International.

See also wrote books with her daughter Lisa See and John Espey under the pen name Monica Highland.

See was known for writing novels set in Los Angeles and co-edited books that revolved around the city, including a book of short stories, LA Shorts, and the pictorial books Santa Monica Bay: Paradise by the Sea : A Pictorial History of Santa Monica, Venice, Marina Del Rey, Ocean Park, Pacific Palisades, Topanga & Malibu, and The California Pop-Up Book, which celebrated the city's unique architecture.

== Personal life ==
See was married to Richard See from 1954 to 1959. They had one daughter, novelist Lisa See (born 1955). Her second husband was Tom Sturak, with whom she had a daughter, Clara Sturak (born 1965). Both marriages ended in divorce. She was then in a relationship with John Espey from 1974 until his death in 2000.

She resided in Pacific Palisades, California.

See described her ideal day as one in which she could "write two hours, work in the yard for two hours, and write ten pieces of mail, that's all I want to do. It never works out that--or not often."

See was a feminist, and said of Betty Friedan's The Feminine Mystique, "I was one of the persons whose lives that book changed." After the publication of Rhine Maidens, See announced she didn't think she wanted to write women's novels anymore, once complaining Blue Money was the only book of hers that men had ever read, 'calling “Making History,” her latest novel, “both a love letter and an apology to the 97% of the men who don’t intend to blow up the world.”'

== Published works ==
=== Novels ===
- The Rest Is Done with Mirrors. New York, Little Brown, 1970.
- Mothers, Daughters. New York, Coward McCann Geoghegan, 1977.
- Rhine Maidens. New York, Coward McCann Geoghegan, 1980; Harmondsworth, Middlesex, Penguin, 1981.
- Golden Days. New York, McGraw Hill, 1986; London, Century, 1987.
- Making History. New York, Houghton Mifflin, 1991.
- The Handyman. New York, Random House, 1999.
- There Will Never Be Another You. New York, Random House, 2006.

=== Non-fiction ===
- Blue Money: Pornography and the Pornographers. New York, Rawson, 1973.
- Two Schools of Thought, with John Espey. Santa Barbara, California, Daniel, 1991.
- Dreaming: Hard Luck and Good Times in America. New York, Random House, 1995.
- Making a Literary Life: Advice for Writers and Other Dreamers New York, Random House, 2002.

=== Novels as Monica Highland (with Lisa See and John Espey) ===
- Lotus Land. New York, McGraw Hill, 1983.
- 110 Shanghai Road. New York, McGraw Hill, 1986.
- Greetings from Southern California. New York, McGraw Hill, 1988.

=== Awards ===
See won both the Guggenheim Fellowship and the Getty Center fellowship. She was also awarded the Robert Kirsch Award by the Los Angeles Times in 1993, an honor bestowed upon an author who writes about or lives in the West.
