= Sand One =

American street artist, entrepreneur (born 1994)

Sand One, also known as Sand Oner (born 1994), is an American street artist and entrepreneur, she is self-taught and best known for her public murals, paintings, merchandise, and "Sand Chick" dolls.

== Biography ==
Sand One was born in 1994, and raised in East Los Angeles by her single mother. She is Latina. Growing up, she grew a passion for art, and eventually she dropped out of high school in order to pursue this passion hers. A year later in 2011, she had her first art show called Bow Ties at only 15 years old, featuring her signature dolls in tuxedos and bowties.

Her signature style features vibrant, cartoon female figures, she calls "Sand Chickz", with exaggerated features such as their eyelashes, L.A.-inspired tattoos, and a mix of playful, tough attitudes. Sand One describes her work as "chick urban street art," emphasizing that her art differs from graffiti, as it focuses on clean, positive imagery rather than the rugged, illegal aspects of traditional graffiti. As an artist she confronts the challenges of being a female street artist in typically male dominated spaces, noting the difficulties of navigating these environments, but also celebrating the empowerment her art brings to other women.

Sand One tends to draw inspiration from her East L.A. roots and the city’s cultural diversity, but also the many fierce woman in her life and all around the world, which fuels her creativity. Although she remains focused on her art and its impact, she expresses aspirations to continue expanding her reach as a resource for the artists and small business owners while staying true to her roots and passion for street art.

== Notable artwork ==
Sand One started as a graffiti artist and her earlier work can be seen throughout Los Angeles on small businesses' walls, on the sides of trucks, and on busy streets. Now as her art has developed, audiences can see her art in art galleries, her own art studio, and on merchandise she creates. Sand One does not consider her art graffiti, she classifies it as “chick urban street art.”

=== Bow Ties: Sandoner (2011) ===
Sand One's “first solo exhibition in Los Angeles,” which included her signature dolls in tuxedos and bowties. This exhibition was at the Casa de La Cultural Galleria in Los Angeles, from April 29 to May 7, 2011.

=== The Thug Love Collection (2016) ===
A collection of acrylic canvases depicting signature dolls and teddy bears. This collection was at Ewkuks Art Gallery in Los Angeles, from January 2 to February 29, 2016.

=== Maria in East L.A. (2017) ===
A graffiti mural on a wall of “Edith’s Market Super Store #1” in East Los Angeles on 5th street and Ford Boulevard, and was painted in April 2017.

=== Long Beach Mermaid (2022) ===
A custom acrylic and aerosol canvas depicting a mermaid at Long Beach in Sand One's signature style. The pieces was delivered to Centro CHA Inc. (Community Hispanic Association) on October 21, 2022.
