= Dragon Bones (See novel) =

2003 novel by Lisa See

- Author: Lisa See
- Language: English
- Genre: Novel
- Publisher: Random House, Inc.
- Publication date: 2003
- Publication place: United States

Dragon Bones by Lisa See (2003) is the third of the Red Princess mysteries, and it is preceded by Flower Net and The Interior. Once again the protagonists Inspector Liu Hulan and Attorney David Stark return—this time as husband and wife.

== Plot summary ==
At the start of the novel, the couple mourns the death of their young daughter Chaowen. Guilt and anguish have driven the lovers apart, unable to get past their mutual loss. Hulan's inner turmoil is made even worse when she is forced to shoot and kill a woman at an All-Patriotic Society rally to save a young girl from being stabbed by her mother. The Chinese government opposes the Society as a threat to public order, an opinion that Hulan strongly shares.

Hulan and David are brought together to work on the same case from different perspectives. Hulan is sent to an archaeological site near the construction of the massive 3 Gorges Dam project to investigate a suspicious death. In an NPR report, See emphasizes the potent symbolism of the Dam, alluding to a 4,000-year-old Chinese saying: "He who controls the water controls the people". She concludes her report by returning to the same idea: ". . . no matter how the outside world views the dam, inside China it will be there to remind the people of a sage emperor; in other words, the current government, who serves the people by controlling the waters". David is sent to the same site to find out how precious Chinese artifacts are being smuggled out of China. The archaeologists at the site are working frantically to find as many antiquities as they can before the dam is completed, flooding their dig site as well as many others. They are especially interested in finding evidence that people in the area have maintained continuous culture for 5000 years.

The plot weaves together several story lines. One involves the difficult task of finding out the true intentions of the All-Patriotic Society. Another is concerned with Chinese archaeology and whether the men and women who work at the dig site are involved in the smuggling of antiquities. With dead bodies turning up rather frequently, Hulan's task in solving these crimes is challenging. And there is also the painful journey of Hulan and David as they try to accept their daughter's death.

Reviewers of Dragon Bones have tended to be somewhat ambivalent about it. Lev Raphael's review is rather typical in this regard. Raphael finds the novel to be "overly romantic" and the conclusion melodramatic. On the other hand, "the real strength of this book is the absorbing portrait of China, from the bugged office of a high official to the dismal hut of a starving peasant, the kind of person who knows what it is 'to eat bitterness.'" See presents an "effective depiction of a modern land held emotionally and socially hostage to the past . . ."
