= Peony in Love =

2007 novel by Lisa See

- Author: Lisa See
- Language: English
- Genre: Novel
- Publisher: Random House, Inc.
- Publication date: 2007
- Publication place: United States

Peony in Love is the fifth of Lisa See's novels. Her previous novel, Snow Flower and the Secret Fan, and Peony in Love emphasize the difficulty 19th- and 17th-century Chinese women had in achieving freedom and identity in a society that was both male dominated and rigid in its gender expectations.

== Plot summary ==
Peony's father, a wealthy, cultured man with important political contacts, is planning a performance of The Peony Pavilion on his estate. This is seen by many as controversial because the opera may influence young women into imitating Liniang, starving themselves to death in hopes of finding love.

Unfortunately, this is just what happens to Peony. She is deeply moved by the text and performance of The Peony Pavilion, having extensively written about her feelings and reactions to love in her copy of the text. On the evening of the opera performance, Peony accidentally meets a handsome young man. After three nighttime meetings, Peony falls in love, but she also falls into deep despair, feeling doomed because of being trapped in an arranged marriage. Following the example of Du Liniang, she starves herself to death, only to learn right before her death that the man her father has picked for her is Wu Ren, the man she loves.

Most of Peony in Love takes place after Peony's death. Because her funeral rituals are not concluded properly, she becomes a "hungry ghost", who wanders far beyond the inner world of women that constrained her in her youth. In the process, she encounters a number of women writers who lament the difficulty of getting their voices heard in a male-dominated world. From her dead grandmother, she learns many painful details about her family's past as the Qing Dynasty violently replaced the Ming Dynasty, details later amplified by Peony's mother. Peony comes to learn about the courage and extreme suffering both older women experienced during the fighting and that the sternness her mother treated her with as a girl was only her attempt to protect her daughter from the evils of the outside world.

Peony shows her enduring love for Ren by her influence on his second wife, although she later realizes that she may have gone too far and actually harmed the girl. Feeling guilty, she puts herself in self-exile, wandering around Hangzhou, until her mother convinces her to go back and make it up for Ren and his second wife. Peony chooses a young and neglected girl to "guide" and, influencing the girl's mother, she slowly molds her into a lovely lady. Ren, a lonely widower, marries the girl as his third wife. After years have past, the third wife starts reading Peony's and the second wife's writings, and after adding on to them she convinces her husband to help her publish them. Not long after Ren realizes that Peony was never given the appropriate funeral rites and finally completes them for her. Peony is no longer a hungry ghost but a spirit who looks forward with great joy to meeting her husband again in the afterworld.

== Background ==
In Peony in Love, the opera The Peony Pavilion by Tang Xianzu, The Three Wives' Commentary on The Peony Pavilion, and the theme of love all play important roles. Of the latter, See has said: "I wanted to explore different aspects of love: gratitude love, pity love, respectful love, romantic love, sexual love, sacrificing love, duty love, and finally mother love". See also stated that The Three Wives' Commentary had a special influence on her as she researched the large amount of writing done by Chinese women in the 17th century, most of it largely unknown today. "Then I came across The Three Wives' Commentary -- the first book of its kind to have been published anywhere in the world to have been written by women -- three wives, no less. With that, my interest turned into an obsession". The three wives of Wu Ren in the novel—Chen Tong (Peony), Tan Ze, and Qian Yi were, in fact, the real women who wrote The Three Wives' Commentary.

The opera presents the love of Du Liniang for a young man, Liu Mengmei, whom she meets in a dream. Unable to turn her dream into reality, Liniang wastes away and dies, haunting Lui as a ghost. Eventually he finds a way to bring Liniang back to life, allowing them to find ultimate happiness.

== Film adaptation ==
On 22 February 2010, Scott Free Productions announced plans to produce an adaptation of the novel with Erin Cressida Wilson writing the script for 20th Century Fox. However, plans fell into development hell.
