= Milton Quon =

American animator, artist, and actor (1913–2019)

- Born: August 22, 1913
- Died: June 18, 2019 (aged 105)

Milton Quon (August 22, 1913 – June 18, 2019) was an American animator, artist and actor.

== Early life ==
Milton Quon was born in Los Angeles, California, to Ng Quan Ying and Wong Shee Quon, Chinese immigrants. He was the eldest and only son, with seven younger sisters. After graduating from Polytechnic High School in 1932, he attended Frank Wiggins Trade School (now Los Angeles Trade–Technical College) and Los Angeles Junior College (now Los Angeles City College), where he earned his Associate of Arts degree. In 1936, he won a scholarship to Chouinard Art Institute (now California Institute of the Arts), from which he graduated in 1939.

== Career ==
Quon started working for the Walt Disney Animation Studios in 1939. Among his credits include Fantasia and Dumbo. He worked as an illustrator for Douglas Aircraft Company during World War II.

After World War II, he returned to Walt Disney Studios in 1946, heading publicity for three years. From 1951-63, he became the first Chinese American art director at a national advertising agency, BBDO. In 1964, he joined the Sealright Company, a packaging firm, as a Senior Design Artist, where he remained until his retirement in 1980. In the 1990s and early 2000s, Quon appeared as an actor in such films as Speed and Sweet Jane.

== Filmography ==
- 1940: Fantasia - Visual effects artist (uncredited).
- 1941: Dumbo - Visual effects artist (uncredited).
- 1994: Speed - Additional bus passenger #2.
- 1998: Sweet Jane - Korean clerk.
- 2000: The Cat Killers - Chinese Mafia Boss.

== Personal life ==
In 1944, Quon married Peggy Wong. They had four children: sons: Timothy (died 2021), Michael, and Jeffrey, and daughter Sherrill.

Quon turned 100 in August 2013. He died on June 18, 2019, at his home in Torrance, California, aged 105.

== See also ==
- List of centenarians (artists, painters and sculptors)
- Tyrus Wong
