= Lisa See =

American writer (born 1955)

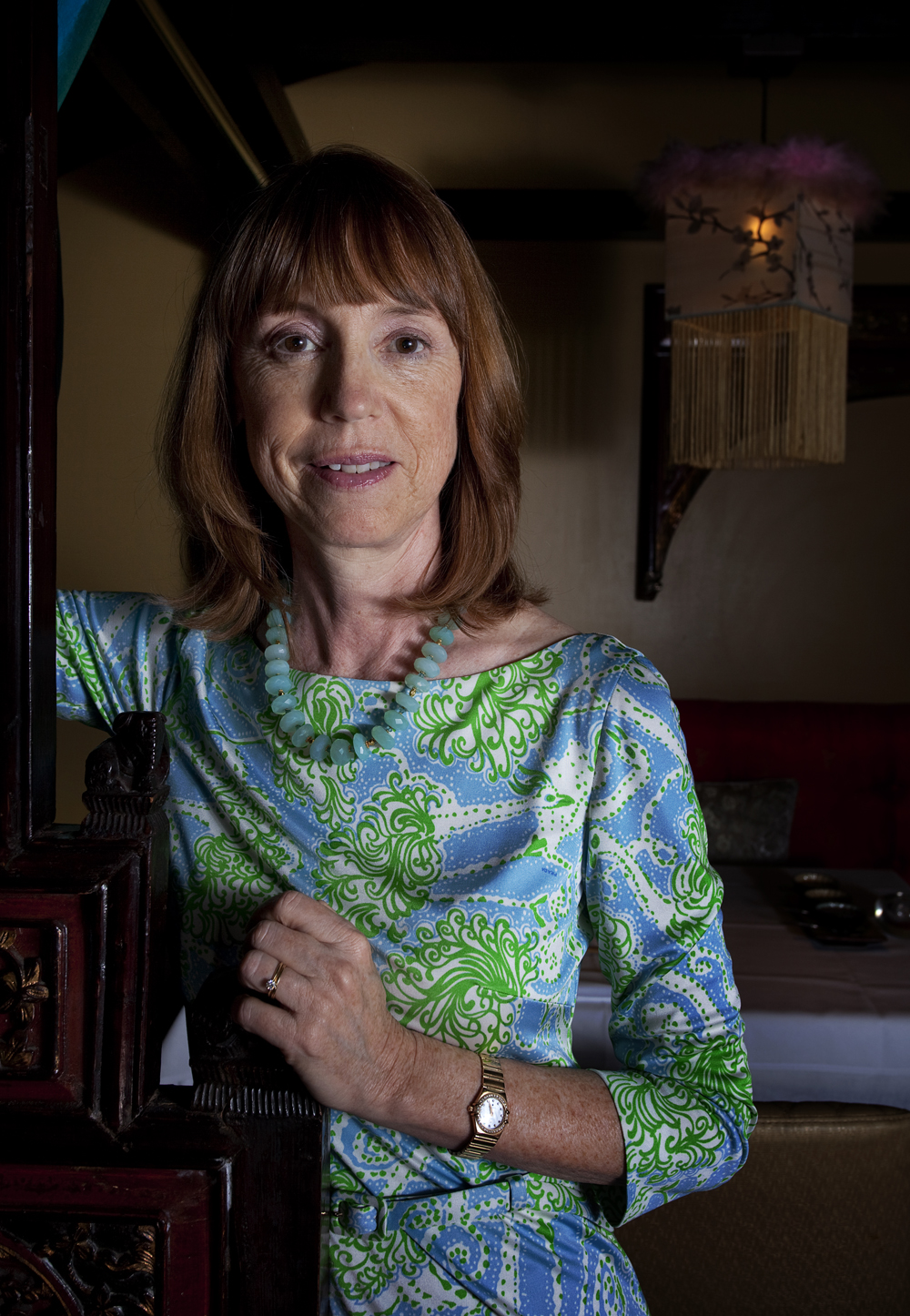
- See in Madrid (2012), by Asís G. Ayerbe
- Born: February 18, 1955 (age 71); Paris, France
- Occupations: Novelist; biographer; writer; community leader
- Spouse: Richard Kendall
- Children: Alexander and Christopher

Lisa See (born February 18, 1955) is an American writer and novelist.

== Early life ==
On February 18, 1955, See was born in Paris, France. See's mother was Carolyn See, an American student who later became an English professor, writer, and novelist. See's father was Richard See, an American student who later became an anthropologist.

See's parents were later divorced, and her mother married Tom Sturak. See has a half-sister, Clara Sturak. See has spent many years in Los Angeles, California, especially in and around the Los Angeles Chinatown.

Her paternal great-grandfather Fong See (Chinese: 鄺泗) was Chinese, which has had a great impact on her life and work. She has written for and led many cultural events emphasizing the importance of Los Angeles and Chinatown.

== Education ==
See graduated with a B.A. from Loyola Marymount University in 1979.

== Career ==
See was the West Coast correspondent for Publishers Weekly (1983–1996). She has written articles for Vogue, Self, and More, has written the libretto for the opera based on On Gold Mountain, and has helped develop the Family Discovery Gallery for the Autry Museum, which depicts 1930s Los Angeles from the perspective of her father as a seven-year-old boy. Her exhibition, On Gold Mountain: A Chinese American Experience was featured in the Autry Museum of Western Heritage, and the Smithsonian. See is also a public speaker.

Her books include On Gold Mountain: The One-Hundred-Year Odyssey of My Chinese-American Family (1995), a detailed account of See's family history, and the novels Flower Net (1997), The Interior (1999), Dragon Bones (2003), Snow Flower and the Secret Fan (2005), Peony in Love (2007) and Shanghai Girls (2009), which made it to the 2010 New York Times bestseller list, and The Island of Sea Women (2019). Both Shanghai Girls and Snow Flower and the Secret Fan received honorable mentions from the Asian/Pacific American Awards for Literature.

See's novel The Tea Girl of Hummingbird Lane (2017) is a story about circumstances, culture, and distance among the Akha people of Xishuangbanna, China. Her 2019 novel, The Island of Sea Women (2019), is a story about female friendship and family secrets on Jeju Island before, during, and in the aftermath of the Korean War.

Flower Net, The Interior, and Dragon Bones make up the Red Princess mystery series. Meanwhile, Snow Flower and the Secret Fan and Peony in Love focus on the lives of Chinese women in the 19th and 17th centuries respectively. Shanghai Girls (2009) chronicles the lives of two sisters who come to Los Angeles in arranged marriages and face, among other things, the pressures put on Chinese-Americans during the anti-Communist mania of the 1950s. See completed a sequel titled Dreams of Joy, released in May 2011. China Dolls (June 2014) deals with Chinese American nightclub performers of the 1930s and 1940s.

Writing under the pen name Monica Highland, See, her mother Carolyn See, and John Espey published two novels: Lotus Land (1983), 110 Shanghai Road (1986), and Greetings from Southern California (1988), a collection of early 20th Century postcards and commentary on the history they represent. She has a personal essay ("The Funeral Banquet") included in the anthology Half and Half.

See has donated her personal papers (1973–2001) to UCLA. During the 2012 Golden Dragon Chinese New Year Parade in Los Angeles Chinatown, See served as the Grand Marshal.

Her latest novel, Lady Tan’s Circle of Women, was published in June 2023. Set in 15th-century China under the Ming Dynasty, the novel is inspired by the true story of a woman physician who struggled to break free from traditions imposed by her arranged marriage in order to help women with their illnesses.

== Filmography ==
- 2011 Snow Flower and the Secret Fan - as a writer.
- 2019 To Climb a Gold Mountain - as herself.
- 2019 Aussie Osbourne Show - S3.E1 - as herself.
- 2022 The Island of Sea Women (in development) - as a writer.

== Awards ==
Among her awards and recognitions are the Organization of Chinese Americans Women's 2001 award as National Woman of the Year and the 2003 History Makers Award presented by the Chinese American Museum. See serves as a Los Angeles City Commissioner. Her book Flower Net was nominated for the 1998 Edgar Award for Best First Novel.

== Published works ==
- On Gold Mountain: The One-Hundred-Year Odyssey of My Chinese American Family. St. Martins Press, 1995. ISBN 9781101910085
- Flower Net. HarperCollins, 1997.
- The Interior. HarperCollins, 1999.
- Dragon Bones. Random House, Inc., 2003. ISBN 9781588362704
- Snow Flower and the Secret Fan. Random House, Inc., 2005. ISBN 9781408821626
- Peony in Love. Random House, Inc., 2007. ISBN 9781408811795
- Shanghai Girls. Random House, Inc., 2009. ISBN 9781408811801
- Chinatown (guidebook), Angels Walk LA, 2003.
- Dreams of Joy. Random House, Inc., 2011. ISBN 9781408826119
- China Dolls. Random House, Inc., 2014.
- The Tea Girl of Hummingbird Lane. Scribner, 2017.
- The Island of Sea Women. Scribner, 2019. ISBN 9781501154850
- Lady Tan's Circle of Women. Simon & Schuster, 2023. ISBN 9781982117092
- Daughters of The Sun and Moon. Scribner, 2026. ISBN 9781982117054

== Additional sources ==
- Fenby, Jonathan. Modern China. New York: HarperCollins Publishers (2008).
- Gifford, Rob. China Road: A Journey into the Future of a Rising Power. New York: Random House Trade Paperbacks (2007).
- Liu, Xian. "Lisa Lenine See". In Asian American Novelists: A Bio-Biblical Critical Sourcebook, pp. 323–331. Ed. Nelson, Emmanuel S. Westport, CT: Greenwood Publishing Group Inc. (2000).
- Pan, Philip P. Out of Mao's Shadow. New York: Simon and Schuster (2008).
- See, Carolyn. Dreaming: Hard Luck and Good Times in America. Los Angeles: University of California Press (1996).
