= Snow Flower and the Secret Fan =

2005 novel by Lisa See

- Author: Lisa See
- Language: English
- Genre: Novel
- Publisher: Random House, Inc.
- Publication date: 2005
- Publication place: United States
- Pages: 257

Snow Flower and the Secret Fan is a 2005 novel by Lisa See set in nineteenth-century China. In her introduction to the novel, See writes that Lily, the narrator, was born on June 5, 1824—"the fifth day of the sixth month of the third year of the Daoguang Emperor's reign". The novel begins in 1903, when Lily is 80 years old. It continues on to tell the story of her life from birth, childhood, marriage, and old age. During her lifetime, Lily lives through the reigns of four emperors of the Qing dynasty: Daoguang (1820–1850); Xianfeng (1850–1861); Tongzhi (1861–1875); and Guangxu (1875–1908).

The University of Southern California China historian Charlotte Furth wrote that Western readers think of Chinese women simply as victims and focus on such problems as footbinding and arranged marriages, but that Lisa See's historical novels "follow the best feminist scholarship on women in the Ming-Qing period by tackling these stereotypes." In Snowflower and the Secret Fan and in Peony in Love, See "asks readers to imagine how a few such women might have found voices of their own within, rather than in opposition to, the Confucian social order, and how they found ways to self-fulfillment without flouting their culture’s fundamental values."

The novel received an honorable mention from the Asian/Pacific American Awards for Literature.

== Plot summary ==
In rural Hunan province called Puwei, a county in China, Lily is destined to become a laotong pair with Snow Flower, a girl of the same age from Tongkou. The laotong relationship is a sisterly relationship that is far stronger and closer than a husband and wife's. Lily's aunt describes it as a relationship "made by choice for the purpose of emotional companionship and eternal fidelity. A marriage is not made by choice and has only one purpose—to have sons." This relationship begins when the girls are seven and goes until adulthood when they are mothers.

The two girls experience the painful process of foot binding at the same time. Foot-binding was the tradition of binding a young daughter's feet by wrapping cloth around their feet tightly and forcing them to walk until their bones broke and were easier to mold and change, then tightening the bindings. Lily and Snow Flower write letters to one another on a fan with Nü Shu, a secret phonetic form of 'women's writing which Lily's aunt taught them.' The women also learn Nü Shu songs and stories and frequently meet at the Temple of the Gupo, where they go to pray for the birth of healthy sons, which is the "measure of a woman's worth."

Both friends are born under the sign of the Horse, but are quite different. Lily is practical while Snow Flower wishes to be free. Although Lily comes from a family of low station, her feet are considered beautiful and play a role in her marriage into the most powerful family in the region. Lily is later known as Lady Lu, the region's most influential woman and a mother to four healthy children (three sons and one daughter). Although Snow Flower comes from a formerly prosperous family, she is not so fortunate. She marries a butcher, culturally considered the lowest of professions, and has a miserable life filled with children dying and beatings at the hand of her husband.

The novel depicts human suffering in many ways: the physical and psychological pain of foot binding; the suffering of women of the time, who were treated as property; the terrible trek up the mountains to escape from the horrors of the Taiping Rebellion; the painful return down the mountain with dead bodies everywhere. Some estimate that the number of people killed during the rebellion was approximately twenty million.

Lily's need for love and her inability to forgive what she considers to be acts of betrayal cause her to inflict harm on many people, Snow Flower most of all. Believing that Snow Flower has not been true to her, Lily betrays her by sharing her secrets to a group of women, destroying Snow Flower's reputation. When Snow Flower is dying, Lily is called to her bedside and tends to her until the end.

As the book returns to the present (1903), Lily is now an 80-year-old woman who has lived forty years after her dearest friend's death. Her own husband and children have since died, and she quietly watches the next generation in her home.

== Film ==
The film version of Snow Flower and the Secret Fan was directed by Wayne Wang and produced by Florence Sloan, Wendi Murdoch, and Hugo Shong. Angela Workman adapted the original script, revised by Ronald Bass and Michael Ray. It starred Gianna Jun, Li Bingbing, Vivian Wu, Archie Kao, and Hugh Jackman. Filming in China began in February 2010. Fox Searchlight acquired North American rights to the film, and released it July 15, 2011.
