= Gold Mountain (toponym) =

Nickname for San Francisco, California and other regions

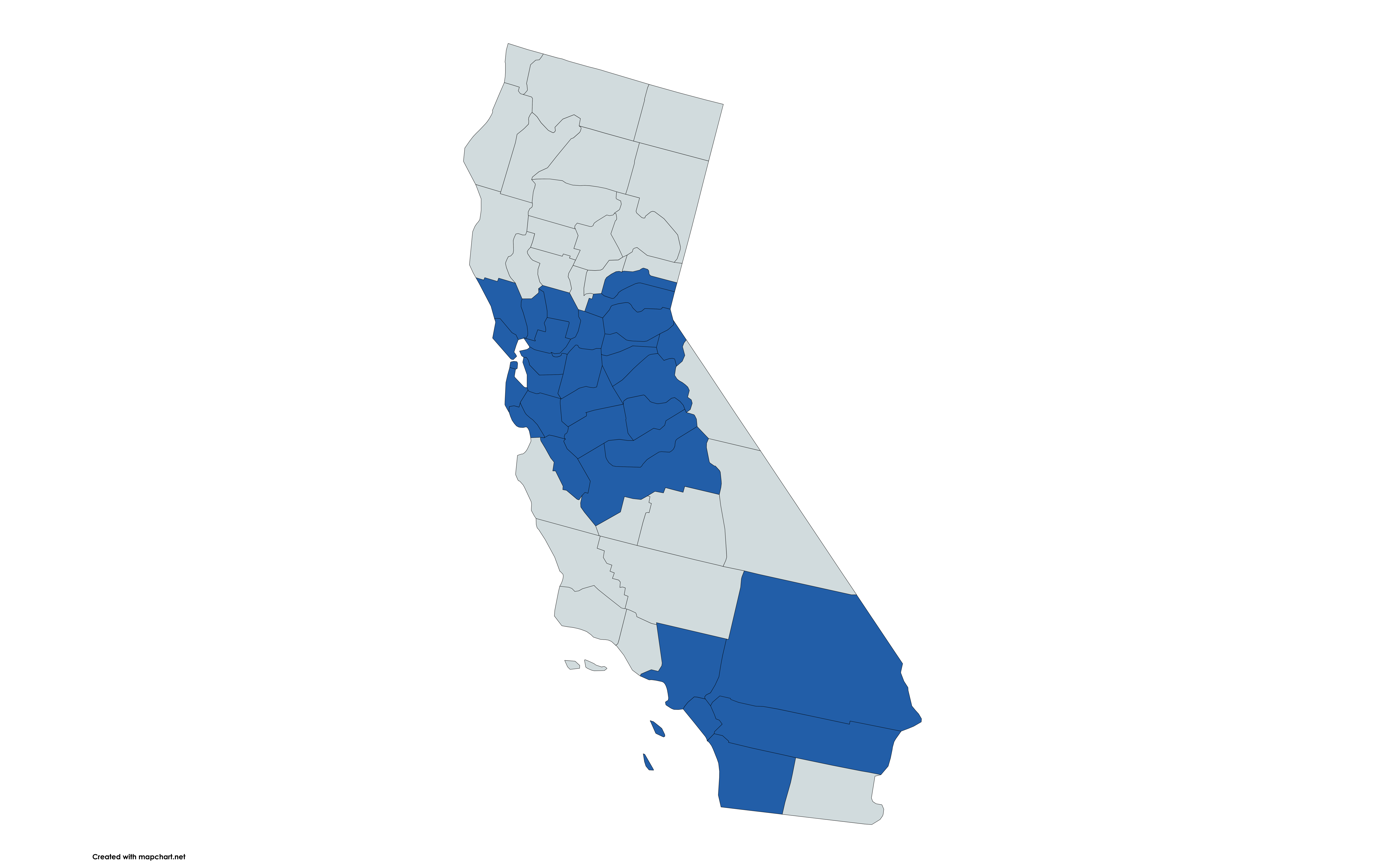
Historic Gold Mountain, Cantonese California

Gold Mountain (Chinese: 金山; Jyutping: gam1 saan1) is a historical name for either San Francisco, the State of California, or broadly the western regions of North America, including British Columbia, Canada. After gold was found in the Sierra Nevada in 1848, thousands of Cantonese from Toisan City in Guangdong Province (Historically known as Canton) began to migrate to California in search of gold and riches during the California Gold Rush.

Chinese people historically referred to California and British Columbia as Gold Mountain, as evidenced by maps and returned Overseas Chinese. However, as a gold rush subsequently occurred in Australia, Bendigo in the then-colony of Victoria was referred to as "New Gold Mountain" (新金山, Sān Gāmsāan), and California became known as Old Gold Mountain (舊金山, Gauh Gāmsāan); although "Old Gold Mountain" now specifically refers to San Francisco.

As considerable time has passed since the 1850s California Gold Rush, foreign Cantonese speakers from Modern China don't refer to California as Gold Mountain anymore, but rather Gāazāu (加州); only the California Cantonese maintain the historic Gold Mountain name for California.

== History ==
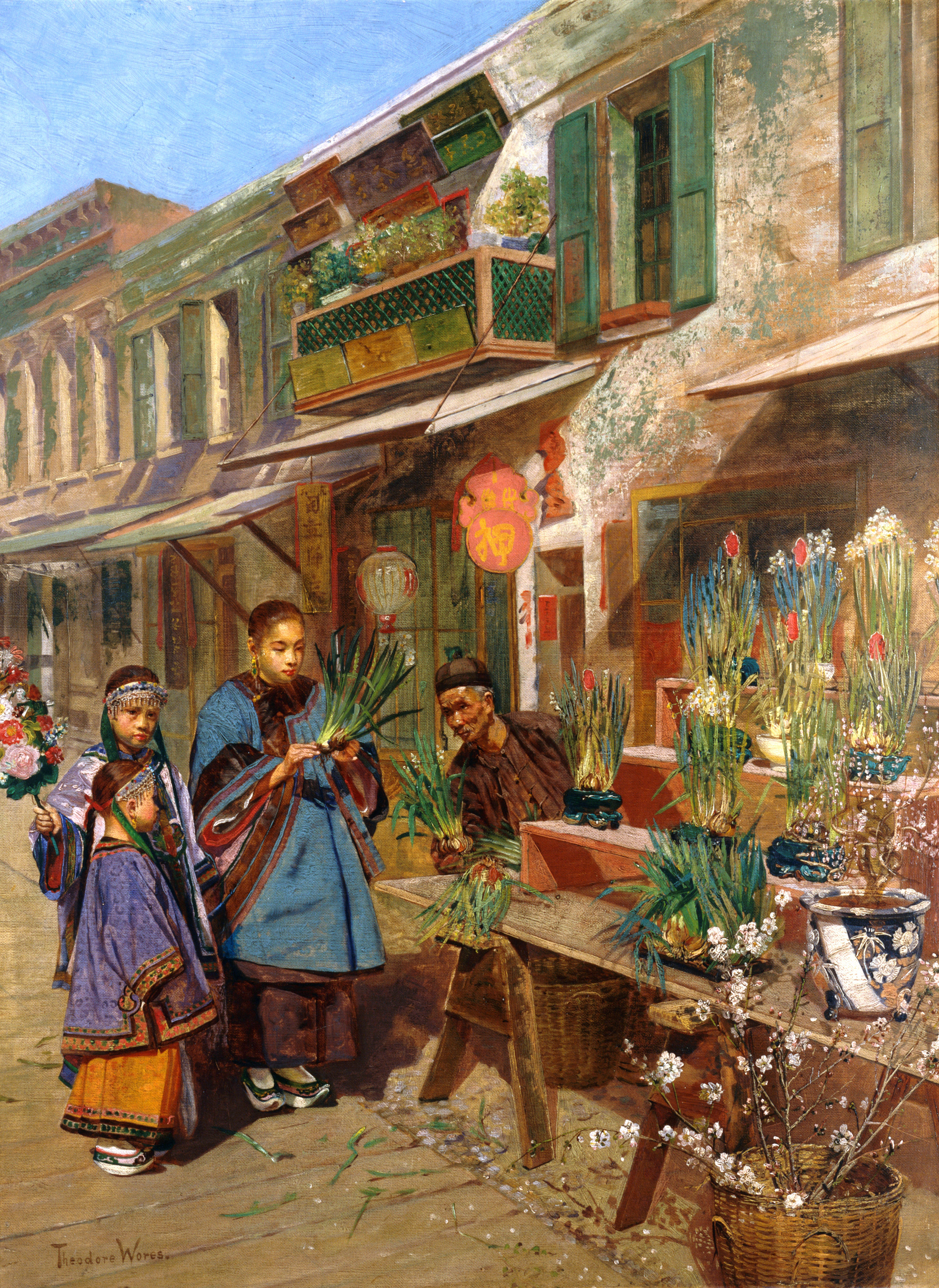
Chinatown, San Francisco, 1881

The name "Gold Mountain" was initially applied to California. Ships full of immigrants docked in San Francisco to disembark passengers, initially bound for the gold fields, but later to remain in the growing Chinese settlement in San Francisco. In the latter part of the 19th century, however, British Columbia also came to be referred to as "Gold Mountain" following the discovery of gold in the Fraser Canyon in the 1857 and the subsequent group of Chinese from San Francisco arriving by boat in June 1858, and further Chinese settlers coming from California and directly from China later on to British Columbia (which they also referred to as "The Colonies of T'ang" i.e. China). The term thus broadened to mean "Western North America". The gold seekers in British Columbia first went to the Chinatown in Victoria, on the Colony of Vancouver Island, to obtain supplies. Victoria was the dominant political and economic centre before the economic ascendancy of Vancouver (which has its own Chinatown), and remains the official seat of political power in British Columbia today.

Following the California Gold Rush, Australian gold rushes began in 1851, making Australia the 'New Gold Mountain', also referring to Melbourne; Sydney became "Sydney Gold Mountain" (雪梨金山, Syūtlèi Gāmsāan).

When the United Nations Charter was signed during the San Francisco Conference in 1945, the official Chinese language text referred to the city as "Gold Mountain City" (金山市).

== Within the Sinosphere ==
Many places in the Sinosphere bear the name 金山 "Gold Mountain". These include (but are not limited to):

- Mountains such as:
  - the Altai Mountains, known in Mongolian and during the Qing dynasty as "Gold Mountain"
  - Various individual mountains such as Mount Jin in Zhenjiang, Mount Jin in Heze, Mount Jin in Tai'an, Kaneyama in Gunma, and Golden Hill, a mountain in Hong Kong, also known as Kam Shan
- Jintan City in Changzhou prefecture and Jinshan District in Shanghai municipality, both formerly counties that beared the name Jinshan
- Jinshan District, Shanghai and Jinshan District, New Taipei
- Jinshan Subdistricts in Benxi, Yichun, Xuzhou, Zhenjiang, Fuzhou, Xiamen, Hebi, Zhumadian, Daye, Zhuzhou, Gaozhou, Meizhou, Chaozhou, Fuquan, Lijiang, and Kokdala
- Jinshan Villages in Guanxi and East District, both in Hsinchu
- Kaneyama, Yamagata and Kaneyama, Fukushima in Japan
- the former Kim Sơn district in Vietnam
- Gunung Mas Regency, known by the local Chinese as Jinshan
- Guiyi Prefecture, also known as the Jinshan Kingdom of the Western Han (Chinese: 西漢金山國; pinyin: Xīhàn Jīnshānguó)

== See also ==
- Chinese migration
- History of Chinese immigration to Canada
