= Googie (disambiguation) =

Googie is a type of futurist architecture originating in 20th century America.

Googie or Googy may also refer to:

== People ==
- Googie Coppola (1950–2008), nickname of Carolyn Coppola, American jazz and pop singer-songwriter, lead singer of Air
- Googie René (1927–2007), nickname of Rafael Leon René, American musician, bandleader, and songwriter
- Googie Withers (1917–2011), nickname of Georgette Lizette Withers, English dancer and actress
- Arthur Googy, American musician and former drummer of Misfits

== Fictional characters ==
- Googie, a character in 1988 animated film Scooby-Doo! and the Reluctant Werewolf
- Googie Gomez, a character in the Broadway play The Ritz
- Googy Gopher, a character in the 1970 American film Pufnstuf

== Other uses ==
- Googie's Coffee Shop, a former restaurant in Los Angeles which served as the namesake for the architectural movement
- "Googy", the 23rd episode of the American comedy series No Activity
