= Covina Bowl =

Bowling alley in California, US, 1956–2017

Coordinates: 34.0881°N 117.9117°W

- Covina Bowl in the 1950s
- Interactive map of Covina Bowl
- Address: 1060 W. San Bernardino Road; Covina, California

Construction
- Opened: 1956
- Closed: 2017
- Demolished: 2021–2022 (partially)

The Covina Bowl is a former, googie-styled bowling alley located in Covina, California. The bowling alley operated from 1956 until closing in 2017. After closing, the bowling alley building and sign were preserved and integrated into a set of new townhomes.

== History ==
Designed in 1955, then built in 1956 and designed by Powers, Daly, and DeRosa, the building's unique architecture was influenced by car culture, jets, the Atomic Age, and the Space Age. The familiar A-Frame neon sign arose that same year. The bowling alley, in addition to a space-age theme, also evoked an Egyptian theme in the interior that was added on in the 1970s. The alley originally had 32 lanes, and would later expand to 50.

Due to years of decline, the Covina Bowl shut it doors on March 12, 2017, with the banquet rooms shutting down the year prior.

After the closure, the property was considered highly endangered by the Los Angeles Conservatory, with the iconic property's future in the air. In 2021, the Covina City Council approved a development plan for the Covina Bowl's property, including a renovation to the original iconic sign.

== See also ==
- Kona Lanes
- Holiday Bowl
- Palos Verdes Bowl
