= List of Googie architecture structures (United States) =

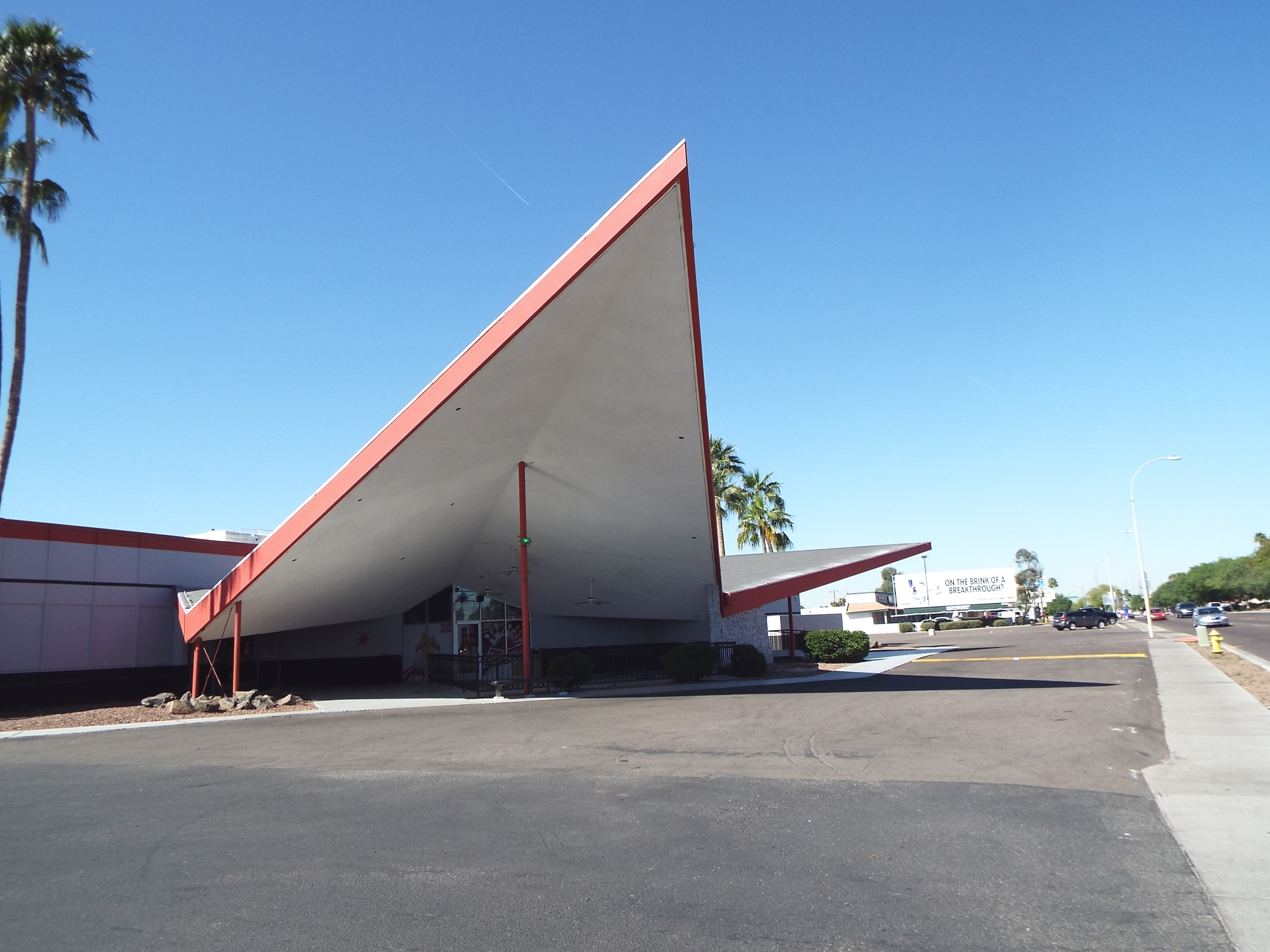
- 300 Bowl; Phoenix, Arizona

This is a list of Googie architecture structures in the United States which includes a photographic gallery with a brief description of some of the structures. Googie was an original architectural style which began in Southern California during the 1940s. Influenced by the coming of the Space Age, the Googie-themed architecture popularity was most notable from the mid-1940s to early 1970s, among motels, coffee houses and gas stations. The term "Googie" comes from a now defunct coffee shop and cafe built in West Hollywood designed by John Lautner.

== List ==
The following are images of some of the Googie architecture structures remaining in the United States.

Googie architecture structures in the United States

	Name of structure	Image	Location
1	Hope International University		Hope International University in Fullerton, California displays classic Googie architecture on its main building and auditorium.
2	Mel's Bowl		An example of a mid-century Googie sign in Redwood City, California.
3	The Anaheim Convention Center		Anaheim, California.
4	Town Motel		Birmingham, Alabama.
5	Food Mart		Woodstock, Tennessee.
6	Pedestrian tunnel		Aberdeen, Maryland.
7	Kona Lanes (demolished 2003)		Costa Mesa, California.
8	Corky's		Sherman Oaks, Los Angeles.
9	Dot Coffee Shop		Houston, Texas.
10	Car Wash		San Bernardino, California.
11	Elm Road Drive-In Theatre sign		Warren, Ohio.
12	Burbank Bob's Big Boy		Burbank, California.
13	The Caribbean Motel		Wildwood, New Jersey.
14	300 Bowl building		Phoenix, Arizona.
15	The TWA Flight Center		John F. Kennedy International Airport, Queens, New York.
16	Sacramento Zoo entrance		William Land Park, Sacramento, California
17	Chips		Hawthorne, CA
18	Roy's Motel & Cafe		Gas station along Route 66 in Amboy, California.

== Doo Wop in New Jersey ==
A number of postwar motels in New Jersey, including a cluster in The Wildwoods, have been recognized as high-style Moderne architecture, and some or all of these have been termed Doo-Wop and/or Googie in style. A number of these were studied in a National Register of Historic Places 2001 architectural survey. The Caribbean Motel (1957) is one of those studied which was subsequently listed on the National Register of Historic Places; it and numerous others are listed in the New Jersey-designated Wildwoods Shore Resort Historic District. The term doo-wop was coined by Cape May's Mid-Atlantic Center for the Arts in the early 1990s to describe the unique, space-age architectural style, which is also referred to as the Googie or populuxe style.

== See also ==
- List of Googie architecture structures (Canada)
- Googie architecture
- Modern architecture
