= Palos Verdes Bowl =

Historical bowling alley in California

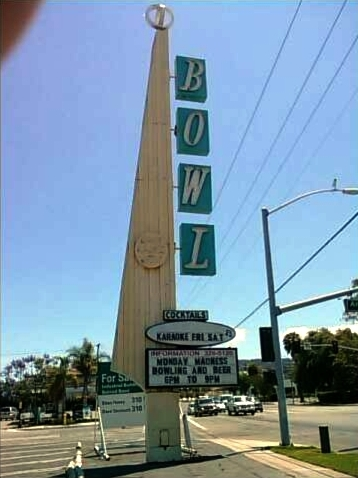
- Address: 24600 Crenshaw Blvd, Torrance, CA 90505

Construction
- Opened: 1958
- Closed: January 31, 2020
- Demolished: 2020

The Palos Verdes Bowl was a bowling alley that stood on Crenshaw Boulevard and Amsler Street in Torrance, California. That operated from 1958 to January 31, 2020.

It was one of the last examples of Googie architecture in the South Bay area of Los Angeles County, after Java Lanes was demolished in 2004.

== History ==
Palos Verdes Bowl was built in 1958, opening as one of the first bowling alleys in the South Bay area, and the first in Torrance. The building would remain mostly unchanged throughout its 62-year run, except for a repaint of the familiar Googie style sign that stood over Crenshaw Boulevard in 2016.

Due to financial difficulties, Palos Verdes Bowl, and a sale of the land for a retail center in 2019.{{cn The bowling alley closed its doors on January 31, 2020. The building would be demolished later in 2020, and in January 2021, a Chick-Fil-A and an Aldi store would open on the land.

== See also ==
- Kona Lanes - another Googie-styled bowling alley in Southern California.
- Covina Bowl
- Hollywood Star Lanes
- Holiday Bowl (building)
