= Tucson Inn =

Historic place in Tucson, Arizona

- U.S. Historic district – Contributing property
- Arizona Register of Historic Places
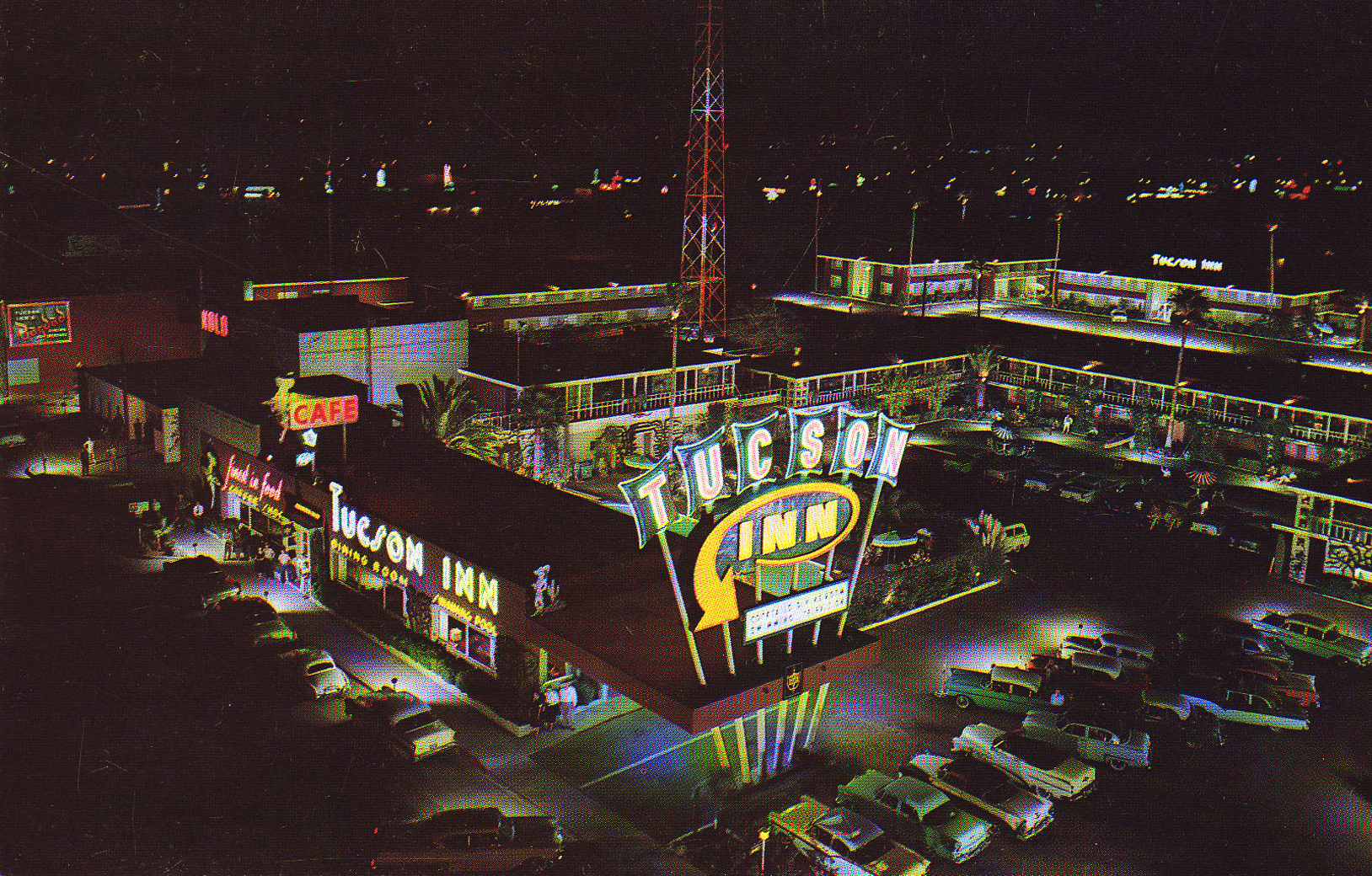
- Location: 127 West Drachman Street, Tucson, Arizona
- Coordinates: 32.239274°N 110.974435°W
- Area: 1.19 acres (0.48 ha)
- Built: 1953
- Architect: Anne Rysdale
- Architectural style: Googie, Modernism
- Demolished: 2025
- Part of: Miracle Mile Historic District (ID100001208)
- MPS: Miracle Mile Historic District

Significant dates
- Designated CP: December 11, 2017
- Designated AZRHP: December 11, 2017

The Tucson Inn was a motel located in Tucson, Arizona, in an area now known as the Miracle Mile Historic District. The motel was built in 1953 in the Googie architecture and Modernist style, and is an example of historic 1950s Mid-century modern highway motel architecture.

Intended to attract tourists and overnight motorists crossing the country on U.S. Route 80 and U.S. Route 89, the building was one of Tucson's largest motor hotels when it was constructed. The luxury inn was designed by Anne Jackson Rysdale, the only registered female architect in Arizona at the time. The architecture typifies classic, clean modernism paired with the boisterous exuberance of midcentury industrial design as exemplified by the monumental neon sign. Amenities enhanced the attractiveness of its sixty-five guest rooms, included a heated swimming pool, formal restaurant, and a diner/coffee shop. The construction of Interstate 10 and the subsequent additional off-ramp exits reduced the relevance and robust economic power of Miracle Mile. Nevertheless, the Tucson Inn and its iconic neon sign survived the corridor's decline. The property was purchased by Pima Community College and after a legal battle, the Tucson Inn was demolished in April 2025.

== History ==
Architect Anne Jackson Rysdale conceived the Tucson Inn as a two-story, U-shaped motor hotel typical of national motel design trends developing across the country following World War II. American prosperity led to increased mobility and national optimism during the 1950s. Artists and industrial creators expressed this new confidence in the design of American cars and architecture. Americans were on the road, traveling paved highways to romantic parts of the country; the proliferation of motels was a natural extension of this highway experience. Before the appearance of now ubiquitous "motel chains," The Tucson Inn was developed as part of a growing movement of improved amenities competing for motor tourist.

The opening of the Tucson Inn was a city milestone. Multiple newspaper articles detailed the property and its opening. According to Micheline Keating of the Tucson Daily Citizen, three months before the property opened on November 8, 1952:

The latest of these luxury motor hotels, Tucson Inn, is expected to be ready for business by the end of November. A 65- unit job, owners Lyndon Miner and Phil Baker say the inn will be a "real showplace when finished." Combining a color combination of brown, white, green, and pink, Tucson Inn will be the only two story motel in Tucson. The U-shape building will feature a covered balcony around the second floor. It will be operated with a 24-hour lobby service and complete hotel facilities. As Newhall puts it: "Our aim is to make Tucson motor hotels the best in the county and help Tucson’s reputation grow as an outstanding spot to stop, to stay, to live." (Keating)

In the days leading to the opening of the Tucson Inn, numerous articles detailed the various amenities available to guests in the January 30, 1953 Tucson Daily Citizen:

Bathing beauties, telecasting, and tours of the premises are among the fanfare and trumpeting heralding Sunday’s formal opening of the new Tucson Inn.

The half-million dollar motor hotel, located on Drachman street just west of Stone Avenue has been receiving guests for the past month. The 63-unit hotel is owned by Lyndon Miner, formerly of Phoenix and Phil Baker of Salt Lake City. The U-shaped structure is two-storied with continuous covered verandas on both floors. There is a large sundeck overlooking Mabel Street. The rooms are so arranged that large families may be conveniently accommodated.

The rooms are furnished with single, twin or double beds and each has a dressing alcove and closet. Some have full bath and shower equipment, and others contain a stall shower only. There is a 24-hour switchboard service to all rooms. And each room is equipped with a radio selector for all Tucson stations as well as one for the reception of record music controlled in the central office. A dining room and coffee shop located in a separate building fronting Drachman Street was opened last Sunday. The coffee shop has 24-hour service. Picture windows in the dining rooms overlook the heated swimming pool and a flagstone lounging terrace. Later on, tables for dining service will be added to the terrace area. The dining rooms are open to the general public as well as hotel guests. The new inn employs a staff of 30 and is managed by Mike Muchmore, who has had four years experience in motor hotel management in Phoenix.

By 1954 the owners began planning for the expansion of the property with the Tucson Inn Annex. By 1956, the 65-unit motor hotel substantially expanded with a second outer "U", encircling the original, increasing the number of rooms to 205. The Manger Hotel Corporation purchased the Inn in 1960 for two million dollars. By 1960, the motel contained four dining rooms, two kitchens, a coffee shop and cocktail lounge, but within a few decades, however, the corridor was in severe economic decline. The large expansion was demolished, leaving only the original buildings.

The motel was home to the Bagdad Room, a bar and restaurant that featured celebrity performers of the mid-century era. The motel's guests included Western film stars shooting movies at Old Tucson Studios, and thought leaders including author Ernest Hemingway and painter Waldo Peirce.

== Demolition ==
The motel was a contributing property within the Miracle Mile Historic District. and was initially saved from demolition in 2018, when it was purchased by Pima Community College who made public commitments at the time of purchase of their plan to preserve and restore the building. However, in late-2024 the college changed course when the governing board led by Theresa Riel, Maria Garcia and Luis Gonzales voted to demolish the hotel along with several other historic properties the college had purchased at the same time. In January 2025 three newly elected board members were seated: Nicole Barraza, Karla Bernal Morales and Kristen Ann Randall. Despite continued outcry from the community these board along with Greg Taylor and chancellor Jeffrey P. Nasse did nothing to stop the demolition The Arizona Preservation Foundation and Tucson Historic Preservation Foundation filed a lawsuit and were initially granted a stay to halt demolition of the buildings, but in April 2024, the Arizona Court of Appeals ruled in the college's favor. Within days college moved forward with demolition the same month.

== See also ==
- National Register of Historic Places listings in Pima County, Arizona
- List of motels
