= No-Tel Motel =

Historic motel in Tucson, Arizona

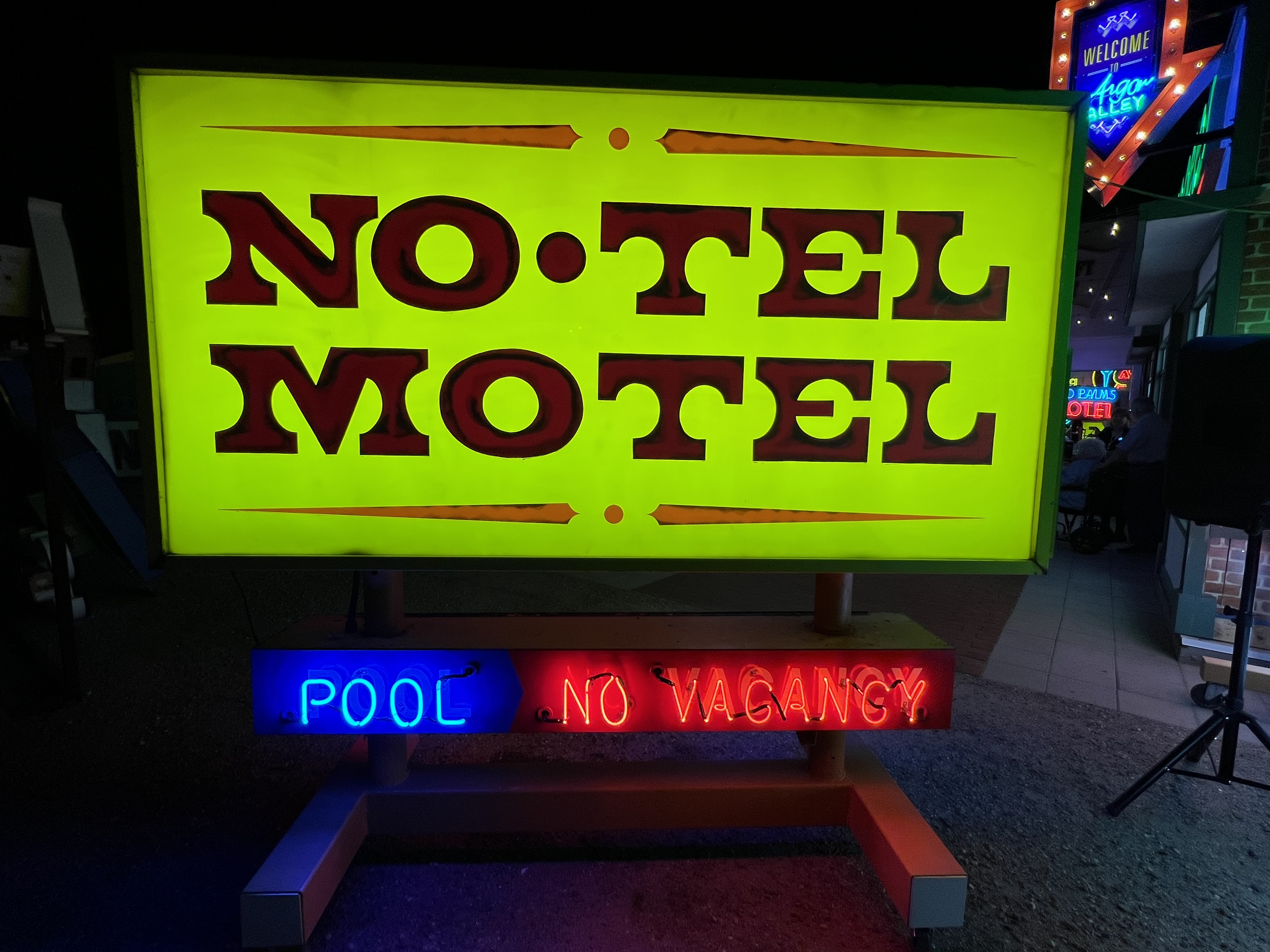
- No-Tel Motel The No-Tel Motel Sign Refurbished and Re-Lit at Night
- Location: 2425 North Oracle Road, Tucson, Arizona
- Area: 1.81 acres (0.73 ha)
- Built: 1942
- Architectural style: Spanish Colonial Revival architecture
- Demolished: 2022
- Part of: Miracle Mile Historic District (ID100001208)
- MPS: Miracle Mile Historic District

The No-Tel Motel was a motel located in Tucson, Arizona, in an area now known as the Miracle Mile Historic District. The motel was built in 1940 in the Spanish Colonial Revival architecture style.

Initially opened as the Dobson Motel, the property had several name changes over the years. The motel was intended to attract tourists and overnight motorists crossing the country on U.S. Route 80 and U.S. Route 89 when it was constructed.

== History ==
The motel was opened by Elmer and Angeline Dobson as the Dobson Motel in 1942 and initially featured rooms with heating, cooling, and tiled showers, as well as some rooms with kitchenettes. It sat along the Miracle Mile strip on U.S. Route 80 in Arizona, where it saw traffic from those traveling through Tucson.

The Dobsons sold the property in 1947. In 1951 it became the De Anza Motel until it was sold again in 1957 and became the Tucson Holiday Motel.

During the 1950s, construction on Interstate 10 in Arizona was occurring which, when completed, led to traffic bypassing the Miracle Mile area.

By the middle of the 1960s most tourist traffic was using the new Interstate 10 causing a decline in business and an economic decline in the Miracle Mile area.

The property changed hands several more times until it was purchased by James L. Blair in 1975. As with many other motels at the time, the No-Tel Motel was converted into a more seedy establishment featuring by-the-hour rates, adult movies, water beds, and massage beds that vibrated.

In 2022, the city of Tucson purchased the property with plans to revitalize the Miracle Mile area and redevelop the property into affordable housing for older adults, similar to many other old motels in the area. The city subsequently demolished the buildings on the property.

== No-Tel Motel Sign ==
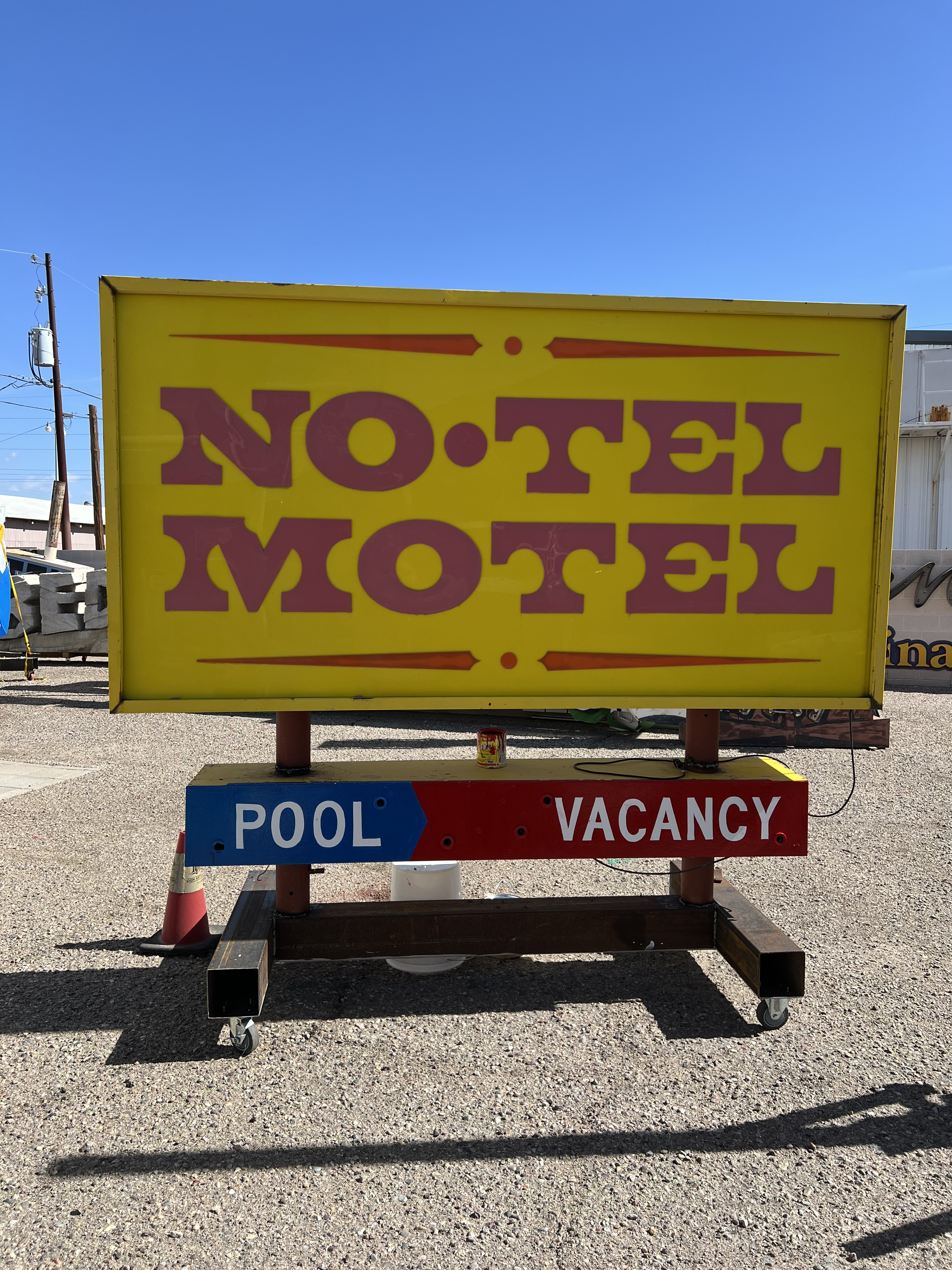
The No-Tel Motel sign after being recovered, and prior to being refurbished.

The No-Tel Motel featured an iconic large sign, which was a draw for many locals who wanted to drive by and see the sign. The sign survived the demolition of the property but initially its fate was uncertain. The city reached an agreement with a local sign museum, the Ignite Sign Art Museum to receive and permanently house the sign. However, the day before the museum was set to retrieve the sign, it was allegedly stolen by a man wearing a cowboy hat and safety vest. After news sources ran articles about the alleged theft, the man showed up to the museum with the sign and turned it over to them. The sign was then refurbished and is now on permanent display at the museum.
