= List of Googie architecture structures (Canada) =

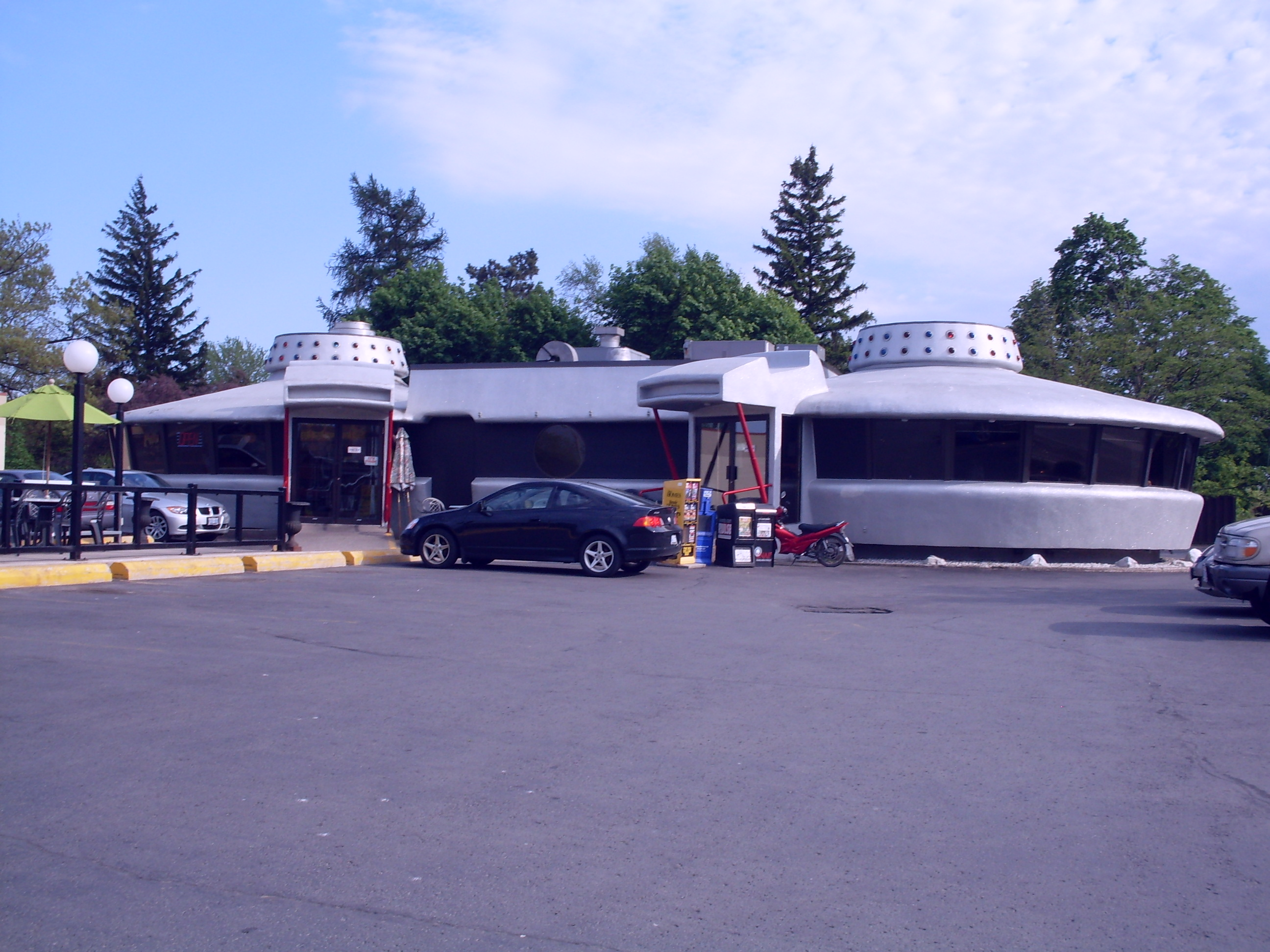
- Flying Saucer Restaurant

This is a list of Googie architecture structures in Canada which includes a photographic gallery with a brief description of some of the structures which still remain. Googie was an original architectural style which began in Southern California during the late 1940s. Influenced by the coming of the Space Age, the Googie-themed architecture popularity was most notable during the mid-1960s, among motels, coffee houses and gas stations. The term "Googie" comes from a now defunct coffee shop built in West Hollywood designed by John Lautner.

== List ==
The following are images of some of the Googie architecture structures remaining in Canada.

Googie architecture structures in Canada

Name of structure	Image	Location / Notes
Skylon Tower		Niagara Falls, Ontario, Canada / c. 1965
Peter Pan Restaurant		711 University Ave, Charlottetown, Prince Edward Island; restaurant closed and abandoned
Terrebonne Cinemas		1071 Chemin du Côteau, Terrebonne, Quebec
Canadian Tire Gas Station (30 built with only a few remaining in Ontario)		2025 Kipling Avenue, Etobicoke, Ontario (1968); 1212 Southdown Road, Mississauga, Ontario (c. 1969); 314 Main Street East, Hamilton, Ontario (c. 1960s); 135 West Street South, Orillia, Ontario (demolished)
Flying Saucer Restaurant		6768 Lundy's Lane, Niagara Falls, Ontario (c. 1974)
Cineplex Odeon Vaughan		3555 Highway 7 West, Woodbridge, Ontario; retro space saucer roof
Metro supermarket at Parkway Mall, Toronto		85 Ellesmere Road, Scarborough (1958)
Retro McDonald's stores in Toronto		520 Oxford St W, London, ON N6H 1T5. 6410 Millcreek Dr, Mississauga, Ontario L5N 0B8.

== See also ==
- List of Googie architecture structures (United States)
- Googie architecture
- Modern architecture
