= Miracle Mile Historic District =

Historic district in Arizona, United States

- U.S. National Register of Historic Places
- U.S. Historic district
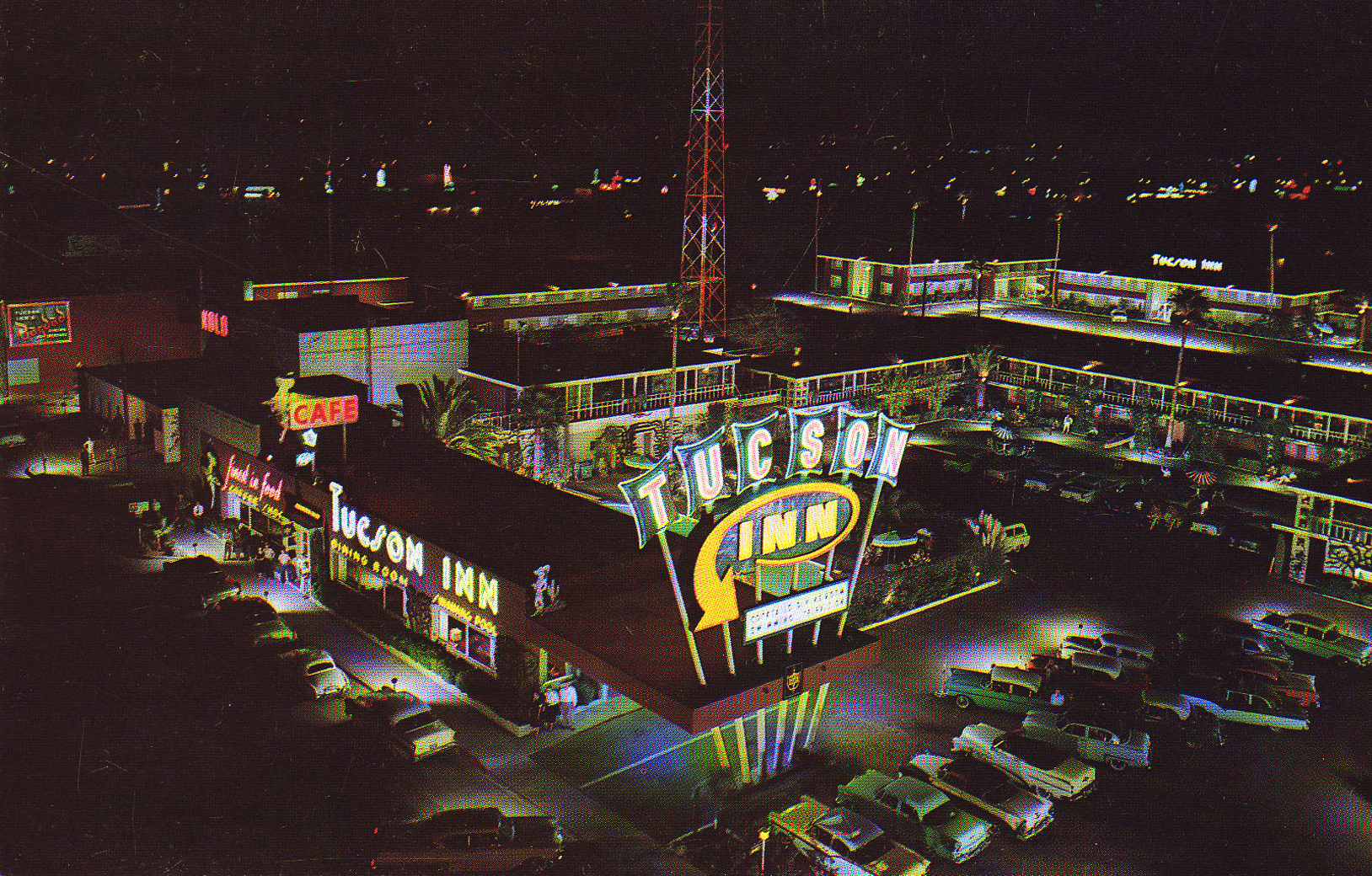
- Tucson Inn, 1958 (Miracle Mile Historic District)

- Location within Arizona Location within the United States
- Interactive map of the Miracle Mile Historic District
- Location: Tucson, Arizona; SR 77 (West Miracle Mile); Historic US 80 (Oracle Road, Drachman Street, Stone Avenue); Main Avenue
- Coordinates: 32°14′42″N 110°58′41″W
- Built: 1920
- Architect: Multiple
- Architectural style: Modern, Spanish Revival, Art Deco
- NRHP reference No.: 100001208
- Added to NRHP: December 11, 2017

The Miracle Mile Historic District, located on North Stone Avenue, Drachman Street, Oracle Road and Miracle Mile in Tucson, Arizona, United States, was listed as a historic district on the National Register of Historic Places in 2017.

== History ==
Located north of downtown Tucson, the Miracle Mile Historic District is a significant commercial corridor connected to the development and alignment of Tucson's northern segment of U.S. Route 80, U.S. Route 89, and Arizona State Route 84. Throughout the mid-twentieth century, this commercial strip, known as “Miracle Mile,” functioned as the northern vehicular gateway of Tucson for travelers traversing the nation. The Miracle Mile Historic District follows the alignment of the following extant arterials: Stone Avenue, Drachman Street, Oracle Road, and Miracle Mile. Also included in the district and associated with the highway site is a two block segment of Main Avenue lined with trucking transfer warehouses and roadside commercial buildings, as well as four blocks of Flores Street containing a cluster of small motels. The bulk of the contributing resources, facing or within one block of the historic highway alignment, relate to mid‑century auto culture and were constructed in 1920 through 1963 during the district's period of significance. While the district has been rendered discontiguous by development, the identified segments have sufficient significance and integrity to meet National Register criteria. Two designated highways are routed down the Miracle Mile Historic District. The Stone Avenue, Drachman Street and Oracle Road segments of the Historic District are part of Historic U.S. Route 80, while the West Miracle Mile segment is part of Arizona State Route 77.

The Miracle Mile Historic District represents four visually and historically linked groups of buildings connected by the alignment of historical U.S. Route 80/89, which is also a contributor to the district. In total, the Miracle Mile Historic District includes 102 individual properties, many with multiple buildings, structures, and objects. Within the Miracle Mile Historic District are 279 individual resources, including 215 buildings, 1 site, 34 structures, and 29 objects. Of these resources, 258 are contributors to the district, including 198 buildings, 31 structures, 28 objects, and 1 site, while 21 are non-contributors, including 17 buildings, 3 structures, and 1 object. The district includes important buildings including the 1953 Tucson Inn, and African American Beau Brummel Club both of which have since been demolished.

== Important buildings ==
- AAA Branch Office, 234 West Drachman Street, 1960
- De Luxe Motel, 1650 North Oracle Road, 1948
- Duke's Drive Inn & Beau Brummel Club, 1148 North Main Avenue, 1947
- El Rancho Motor Hotel, 225 West Drachman Street, 1948
- Frontier Motel, 227 West Drachman Street, 1941/48 architect: George J. Wolf
- Flamingo Hotel, 1300 North Stone Avenue, 1954
- G. D. F. Frazier Service Station, 648 North Stone Avenue, 1937
- Ghost Ranch Lodge, 801 West Miracle Mile, 1941
- Golden Pin Lanes, 922 West Miracle Mile, 1950
- Hacienda Motel, 1704 North Oracle Road, c.1940
- Highland Tower Motel, 1919 North Oracle Road, 1941
- No-Tel Motel, 2425 North Oracle Road, 1940
- Oracle Court, 2649 North Oracle Road, 1940
- Pago Pago Restaurant & Lounge, 2201 North Oracle Road, c, 1945
- Riviera Motor Lodge, 515 West Miracle Mile, 1953
- Monterey Court, 505 West Miracle Mile, 1952
- Motel El Corral, 2725 North Oracle Road, 1949
- La Siesta Motel, 1602 North Oracle Road, 1941
- Sun Land Motel, 465 West Miracle Mile, 1952
- Thunderbird Lodge, 1941, architect: George J. Wolf
- Terrace Mote, 631 West Miracle Mile, 1949
- Tidelands Motor Inn (Sahara Motel), 919 North Stone Avenue, 1960
- Tucson House, 1501 North Oracle Road, 1963
- Tucson Inn, 143 West Drachman Street, 1953
- Wash Well, 2 West Drachman Street, 1955
- Wayward Winds Motel, 707 West Miracle Mile, 1958

== See also ==
- National Register of Historic Places listings in Pima County, Arizona
