= Googie's Coffee Shop =

Former restaurant in California

Googie's Coffee Shop (styled googies) was a small restaurant located at 8100 Sunset Boulevard in Los Angeles next to Schwab's Pharmacy. It was designed in 1949 by architect John Lautner and lent its name to Googie architecture, a genre of modernist design in the 1950s and 60s. Interest in the style was revived by the 1986 book Googie: Fifties Coffee Shop Architecture by Alan Hess.

A 1952 article in House & Home magazine titled "Googie Architecture" featured a photograph of the building by Julius Shulman with commentary on the unique style by critic Douglas Haskell. "(The building) starts off on the level like any other building," Haskell wrote. "But suddenly it breaks for the sky. The bright red roof of cellular steel decking suddenly tilts upward as if swung on a hinge, and the whole building goes up with it like a rocket ramp."

Additional Googie's locations were built at 5th & Olive Street in Downtown Los Angeles in 1955. Architects Armet & Davis created an eye-catching roof for the restaurant which was located on the ground floor of the six-story San Carlos Hotel. Another location was opened in the City National Bank building at 420 N. Roxbury Drive in Beverly Hills, California. Googie's Beverly Hills was photographed by Allan Grant for Life magazine in 1956. Another location operated at the Atlantic Square shopping center at 2080 S. Atlantic Boulevard in Monterey Park, California.

The restaurant was originally owned by Mortimer C. Burton and Ernie Goldenfeld. By 1954, the restaurant was sold to Ed Thrasher. It became a popular meeting place for celebrities including James Dean who often made latenight visits with a regular group that included actor and artist Dennis Hopper and TV horror host Maila Nurmi, also known as Vampira. Dean was photographed at the restaurant by Phil Stern. Steve Hayes, onetime manager of the restaurant, noted that Marilyn Monroe, Natalie Wood, Lee Marvin, and Steve McQueen were regular customers during the 1950s.

Comedian Lenny Bruce got into a fight inside the restaurant in 1957 and was thrown through a plate glass window.

The restaurant changed hands several times from the 1960s to the 1980s and operated as Gee Gee's, Steak 'n Stein, and Pippy's Pizza. The property, along with neighboring Schwab's Pharmacy, was sold to developer Condor Wescorp and demolished in 1988. The site is now a two-story shopping center called 8000 Sunset Strip.
