= Kona Lanes =

Former bowling center in Costa Mesa, California

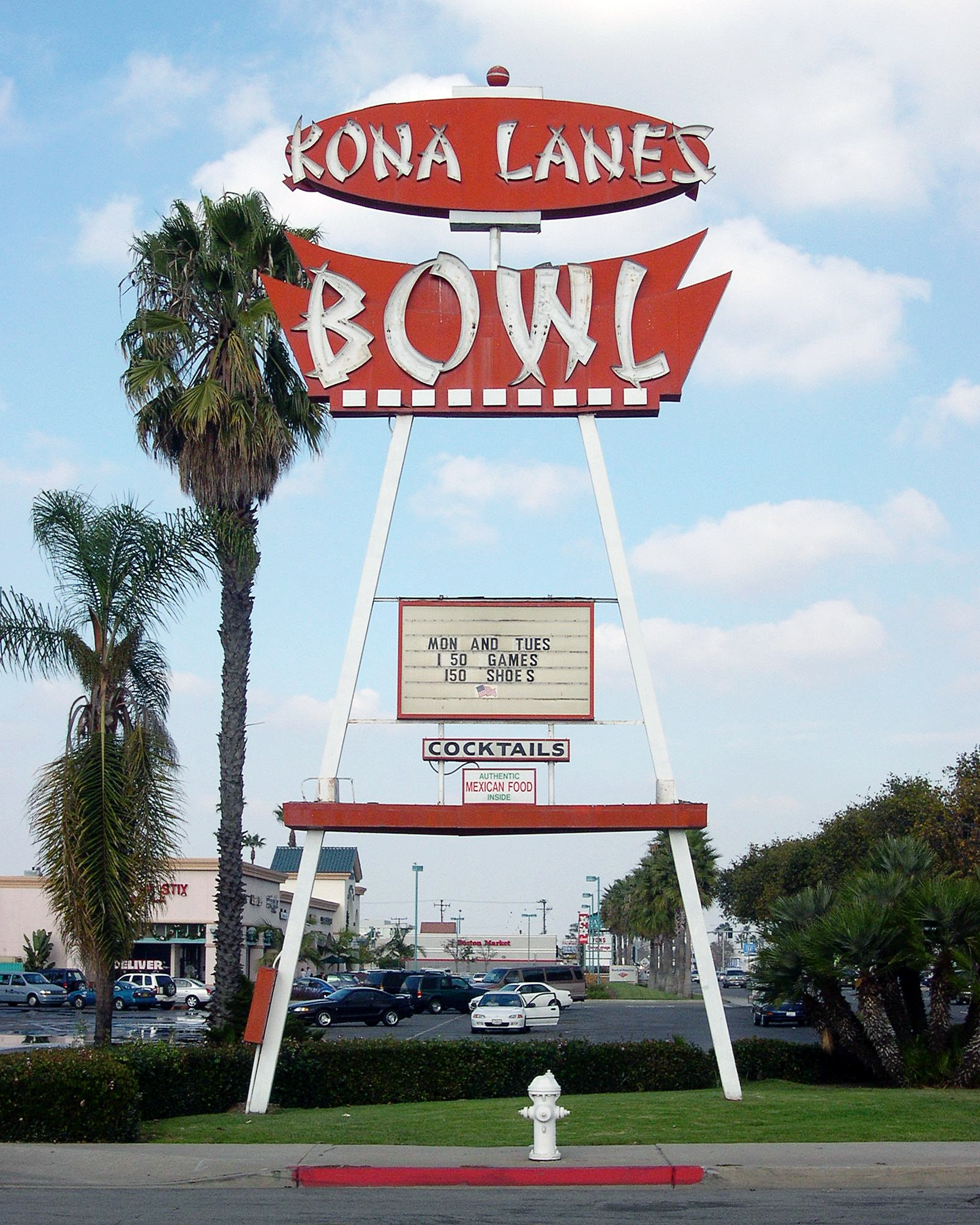
- The Kona Lanes Bowl roadside sign in 2002
- Interactive map of Kona Lanes
- Former names: New Kona Lanes (1980s)
- Address: 2699 Harbor Blvd. Costa Mesa, California, U.S.
- Coordinates: 33.671083°N 117.920306°W
- Owner: Jack Mann Jr. (last)
- Type: Bowling center

Construction
- Built: 1958
- Opened: 1958 (68 years ago)
- Renovated: 1981
- Closed: 2003 (23 years ago)
- Demolished: 2003
- Architects: Powers, Daly, & DeRosa
- Builders: Quigley & Clark

Kona Lanes was a bowling center in Costa Mesa, California, United States, that operated from 1958 to 2003. Known for its futuristic design, it featured 40 wood-floor bowling lanes, a game room, a lounge, and a coffee shop that eventually became a Mexican diner. Built during the advent of Googie architecture, its Polynesian-inspired Tiki styling extended from the large roadside sign to the building's neon lights and exaggerated rooflines.

When Kona Lanes was demolished in 2003, it was one of the last remaining examples of the Googie style in the region; its sister center, Java Lanes in Long Beach, was razed in 2004. Much of Kona's equipment was sold prior to the demolition, but the distinctive sign was saved and sent to Cincinnati, where a portion is on permanent display in the American Sign Museum. Costa Mesa's planning commission approved a proposal to build a department store on the site, but those plans were scrapped following public outcry. In 2010, the still-vacant land was rezoned for senior citizens' apartments and commercial development. Construction on the apartments began ten years after Kona Lanes was demolished.

== History ==
=== Early years ===
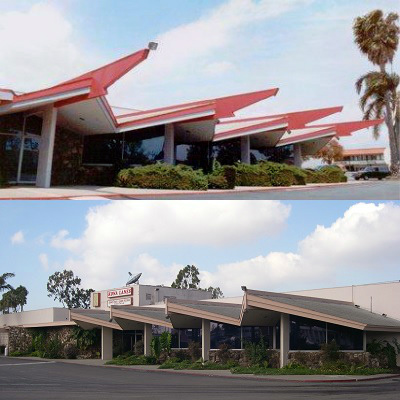
Kona Lanes before (top) and after a remodel taming its "ostentatious rooflines" (Scott Martelle, Los Angeles Times)

Kona Lanes opened in 1958, featuring the Tiki-inspired signage and architecture that became popular following World War II, including what the Los Angeles Times called its "flamboyant neon lights and ostentatious rooflines meant to attract motorists like moths". The building on Harbor Boulevard near Adams Avenue was one of three in the Googie style that architects Powers, Daly, & DeRosa designed at around the same time; Kona Lanes and its sister center, Java Lanes, used names that suggested South Pacific island locales. Author Andrew Hurley called them "expensive and attractive buildings that screamed, 'Have fun here'", and Kona retained much of that atmosphere over the years. Its massive neon-lit street sign remained for the life of the building, and Kona was the only bowling establishment in the area to reject automatic scoring equipment throughout its existence.

Kona Lanes hosted the Southern California PBA Open twice in 1964; Billy Hardwick won in April and Jerry Hale in December. Longtime general manager Dick Stoeffler, known at the time as the producer and host of TV Bowling Tournament on KTLA, finished third during the televised finals in his own building in December, behind Hale and Hardwick. When Stoeffler rolled back-to-back 300 games in one league session at Kona in 1968, he was one of only four men in the United States to have managed the feat.

=== Peak years ===
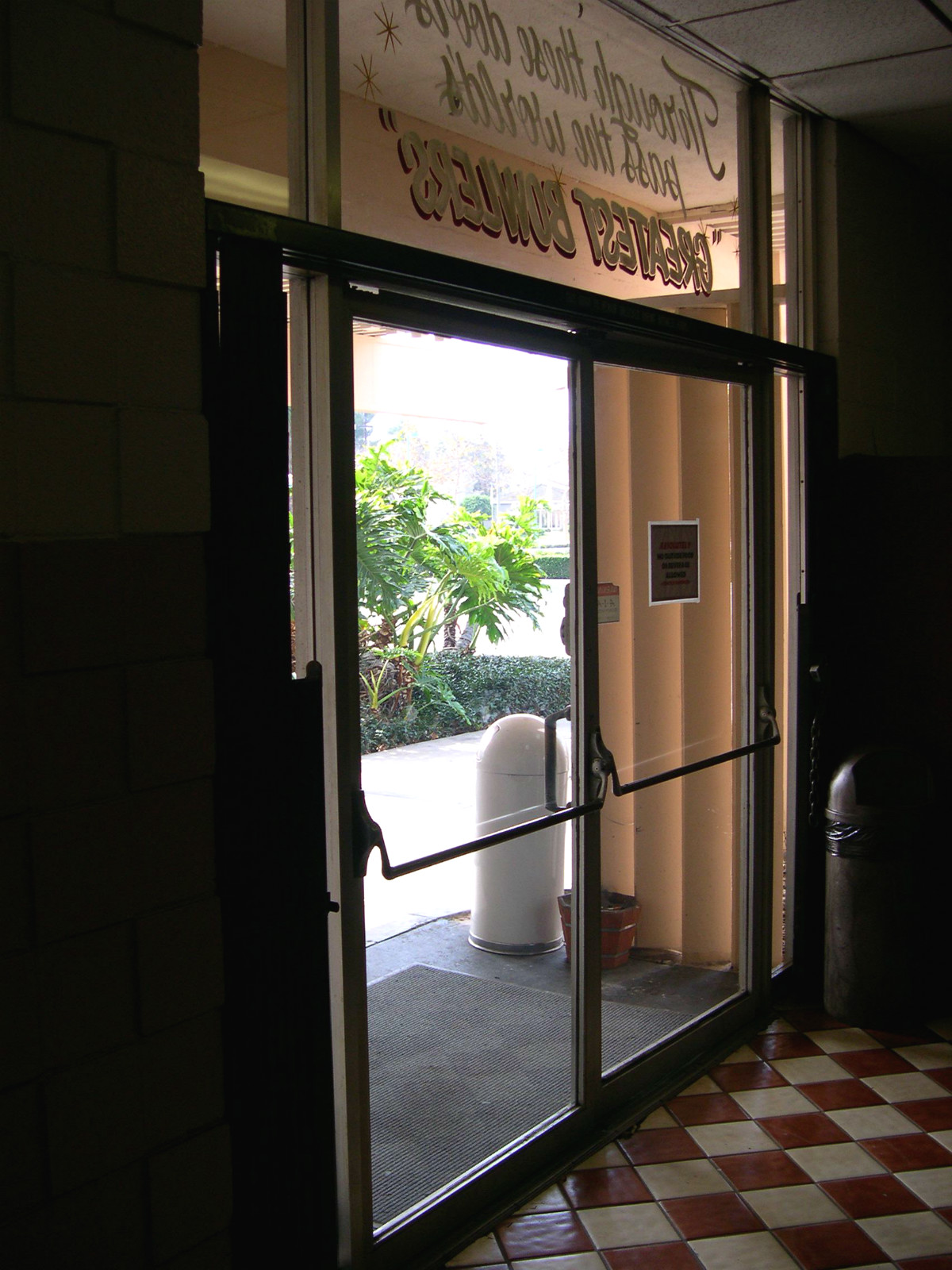
Kona Lanes main entrance: 'Through these doors pass the world's greatest bowlers'

Champions who bowled at Kona Lanes during its 45-year history include three-time Professional Bowlers Association Tour winner Jack Biondolillo; six-time male Bowling Writers Association of America Bowler of the Year and future PBA Hall of Famer Don Carter; John Haveles, an Orange County Bowling Hall of Fame inductee who began a stint as Kona's manager in 1974; future Michigan Women's Bowling Association Hall of Famer Cora Fiebig; two-time female BWAA Bowler of the Year Aleta Sill; repeat bowler of the year and WIBC Hall of Famer Donna Adamek; and Barry Asher, the multiple PBA Tour champion and Hall of Fame inductee who later ran the pro shop at Fountain Bowl in nearby Fountain Valley. Kona Lanes and Tustin Lanes hosted nearly 10,000 teams of five players each taking part in the United States Bowling Congress Women's Championships in 1986.

Under Dick Stoeffler's management, Kona Lanes kept busy 24 hours a day, which made him one of the most successful proprietors in the country. Stoeffler met his future wife there; other couples had similar experiences, including at least one wedding. The center was often so busy that customers had to make reservations to get a lane during open bowling hours. At its peak, Kona Lanes averaged more than 80 lines on each of its 40 lanes.

Bowling as a participation sport flourished in the early 1960s, but its popularity was diluted due to overbuilding; the number of bowling alleys sanctioned by the then-American Bowling Congress peaked at about 11,000 by mid-decade, and Kona was one of more than 30 in southern California alone. A decline in league bowling starting in the 1980s was also blamed for the downturn, but an AMF Bowling official argued that the customer base remained steady because an increase in open bowling made up for fewer league bowlers.

Jack Mann bought Kona Lanes in 1980 and re-branded it New Kona Lanes the following year. Mann's family owned several bowling centers in the region; he was behind the creation of Fountain Bowl in 1973 and the short-lived Regal Lanes in Orange in 1974. He also owned Tustin Lanes before selling it to his youngest son, Alex. Mann bought Kona Lanes not because he loved bowling, but because it would continue to pay dividends if he was no longer able to work. He later sold it to his son Jack Jr.

=== Music ===
The center's lounge, the Outrigger Room, hosted many local artists over the years. Jazz quintet The Redd Foxx Bbq released four songs recorded there, and Roscoe Holland recorded a set of eight live performances for his album Beyond the Reef.

In later years, much of the bowlers' area was taped off for rock concerts and weekend promotions like Club Crush, which proved popular among teenagers and also led to album recordings. A planned event featuring a local punk rock group was shut down by the Costa Mesa Police Department, leading to negative publicity.

=== Decline and demolition ===
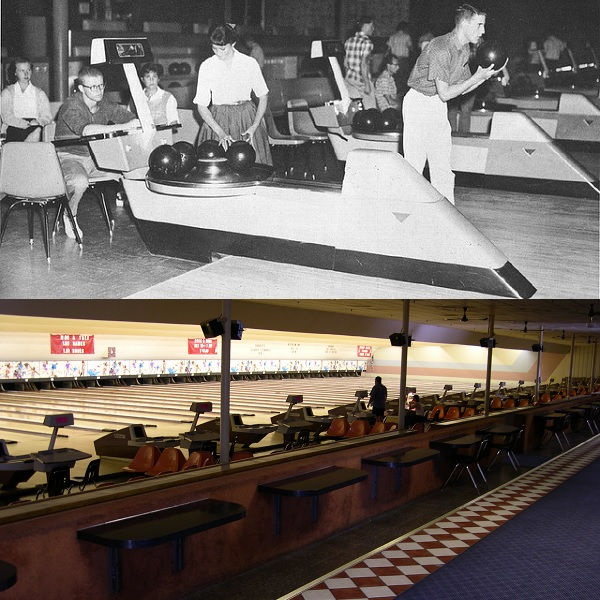
Kona Lanes in 1960 (top) and in 2002

Kona Lanes continued to lose business to newer centers, despite efforts to appeal to a more diverse customer base by hosting local music acts, supporting a Polynesian-themed restaurant called Kona Korral, and promoting gimmicks like "nude bowling". Eventually, the property became more valuable than the business. The landowners, C.J. Segerstrom & Sons, gave Jack Mann Jr. a choice: spend $10–20 million to update the center, or give it up. Mann chose the latter rather than spend such a sum on a site without a long-term lease.

Plans to build a Kohl's department store on the site occupied by Kona Lanes and the already-closed Edwards Cinema Center and Ice Capades Chalet were approved by the city's planning commissioners, but they were met with resistance by neighbors who did not believe the store was a good fit for the area. In February 2003, Mayor Karen Robinson complained to commissioners that Costa Mesa's policy-makers were discarding recreation as part of the quality of residents' lives, and appealed their decision. The city council later rejected the proposal. Meanwhile, the efforts to save Kona Lanes failed; it closed for good in May 2003 and was demolished soon after.

=== Rezoning and new use ===
The 7.5-acre parcel was rezoned in 2010 for senior housing that was expected to provide a new customer base for the restaurants and retailers already in the area and for commercial developments still to come. The lot had sat unused for about ten years before construction on the 215-unit complex began; Azulón at Mesa Verde opened in 2014. Several dozen palm and eucalyptus trees were saved and replanted on the site.

== Legacy ==
=== Closure and community response ===
Activity at Kona Lanes increased in its final days, due to the nostalgic value of potential keepsakes. Manager Juanita Johnson said people were asking to buy furniture, office equipment, and more. "Some of that is older than I am." The more substantial items, including the original wood lanes, had been sold off prior to demolition, while dumpster divers hit the parking lot each day, looking for any items of interest.

The loss of Kona Lanes was a repeated topic at political events. One Costa Mesa city council candidate said he made a commitment to public service when the building was torn down with little resistance. Another would-be council member agreed that the demolition should never have happened.

In 2012, Costa Mesa planners began to upgrade The Triangle, a retail space along Harbor Boulevard two miles south of the Kona Lanes site. Those plans featured a 10-lane bowling alley that opened in 2014. One city official said the center answered residents' longtime call for a new, upscale bowling facility.

=== Historic roadside sign ===
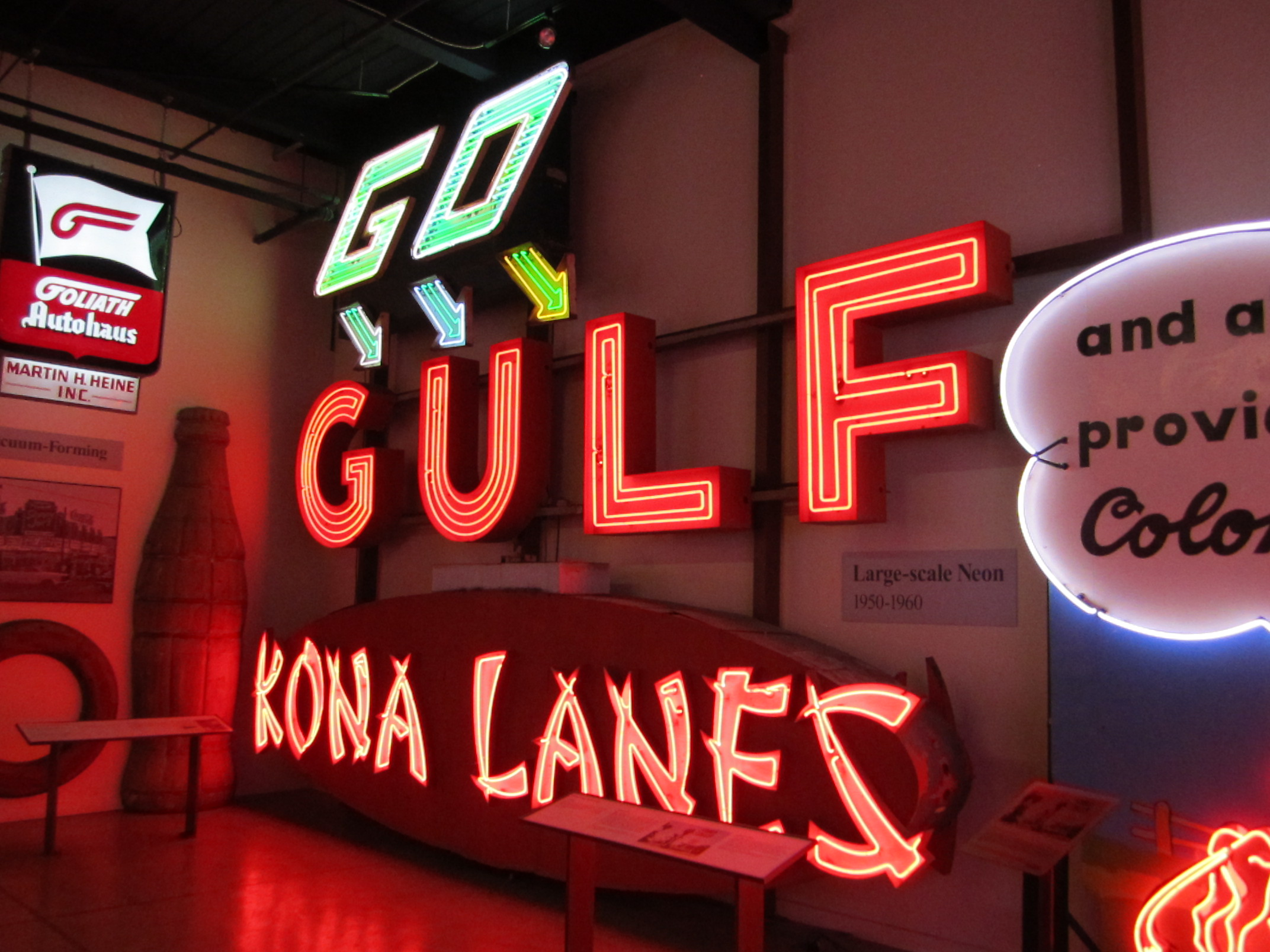
The KONA LANES sign on display at the American Sign Museum in 2014

The huge, neon-lit KONA LANES BOWL sign was featured in publications by the Costa Mesa Historical Society, along with The Book of Tiki and Tiki Road Trip; it also inspired professional paintings, and was one of several Costa Mesa landmarks memorialized in a mural painted on the local Floyd's 99 Barbershop. In 2003, Costa Mesa Planning Commissioner Katrina Foley led an effort to save the sign from the scrap heap.

Thanks in part to a private donation, the marquee was trucked 2,500 miles to Cincinnati, one of the first 20 signs accepted by the American Sign Museum. The KONA LANES cabinet was refurbished and put on permanent display; the larger, badly rusted BOWL section tore and collapsed as it was offloaded in Cincinnati, and was not saved.

== See also ==
- Ten-pin bowling
