= Googie architecture =

20th-century American architectural style

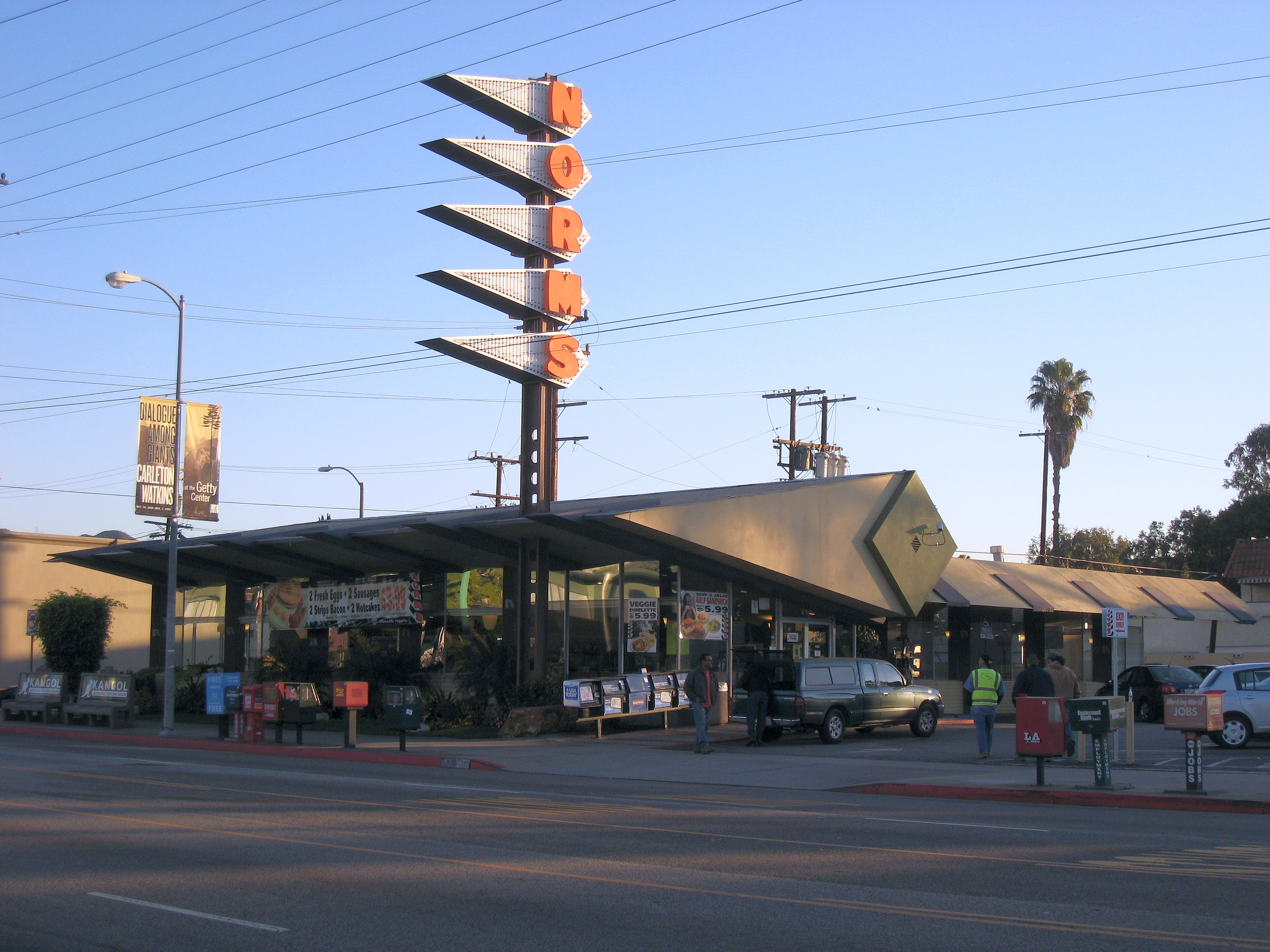
Norms Restaurants location on La Cienega Boulevard in Los Angeles

Googie architecture (/ˈɡuːɡi/ GOO-ghee) is a type of futurist architecture influenced by car culture, jets, the Atomic Age and the Space Age. It originated in Southern California from the Streamline Moderne architecture of the 1930s, and was popular in the United States from roughly 1945 to the early 1970s.

Googie-themed architecture was popular among roadside businesses, including motels, coffee houses and gas stations. The style later became widely known as part of the mid-century modern style, elements of which represent the populuxe aesthetic, as in Eero Saarinen's TWA Terminal. The term Googie comes from the now-defunct Googies Coffee Shop in Hollywood designed by John Lautner. Similar architectural styles are also referred to as Populuxe or Doo Wop.

Features of Googie include upswept roofs, curvilinear, geometric shapes, and bold use of glass, steel and neon signs. Googie was also characterized by Space Age designs symbolic of motion, such as boomerangs, flying saucers, diagrammatic atoms and parabolas, and free-form designs such as "soft" parallelograms and an artist's palette motif. These stylistic conventions represented American society's fascination with Space Age themes and marketing emphasis on futuristic designs. As with the Art Deco style of the 1910s–1930s, Googie became less valued as time passed, and many buildings in this style have been destroyed. Some examples have been preserved, though, such as the oldest McDonald's stand (located in Downey, California).

== Origins ==
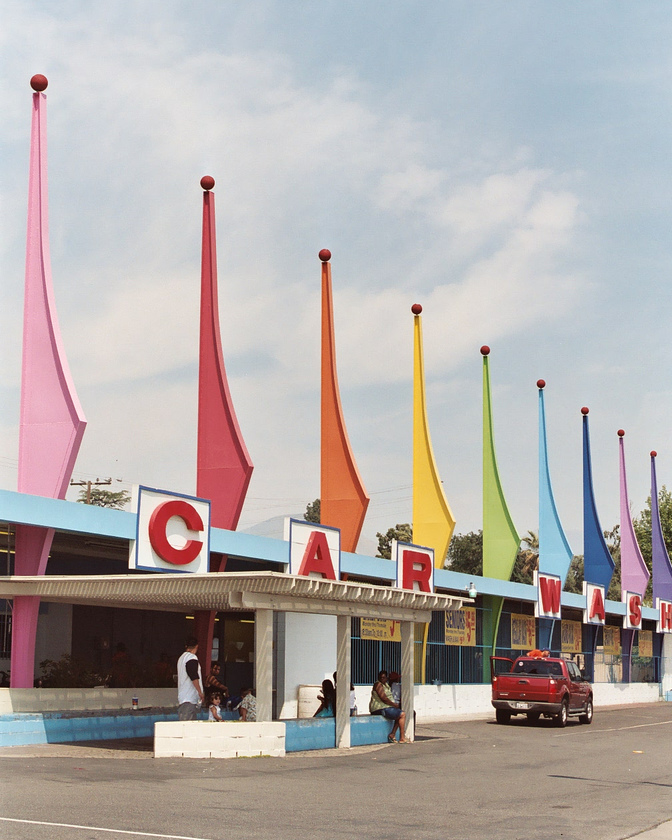
Googie-style car wash

The origin of the name Googie dates to 1949, when architect John Lautner designed the Googie's Coffee Shop in Hollywood, which had distinct architectural characteristics. The name "Googie" had been a family nickname of Lillian K. Burton, the wife of the restaurant's original owner, Mortimer C. Burton, and aunt of musician Peter Matz.

Googie's was located at the corner of Sunset Boulevard and Crescent Heights in Los Angeles but was demolished in 1989. The name Googie became a rubric for the architectural style when editor Douglas Haskell of House and Home magazine and architectural photographer Julius Shulman were driving through Los Angeles one day. Haskell insisted on stopping the car upon seeing Googie's and proclaimed "This is Googie architecture." He popularized the name after an article he wrote appeared in a 1952 edition of House and Home magazine.

Though Haskell coined the term Googie and was an advocate of modernism, he did not appreciate the Googie aesthetic. In his article he used the fictional Professor Thrugg's overly effusive praise to mock Googie, at the same time lampooning Hollywood, which he felt informed the aesthetic.

== History ==
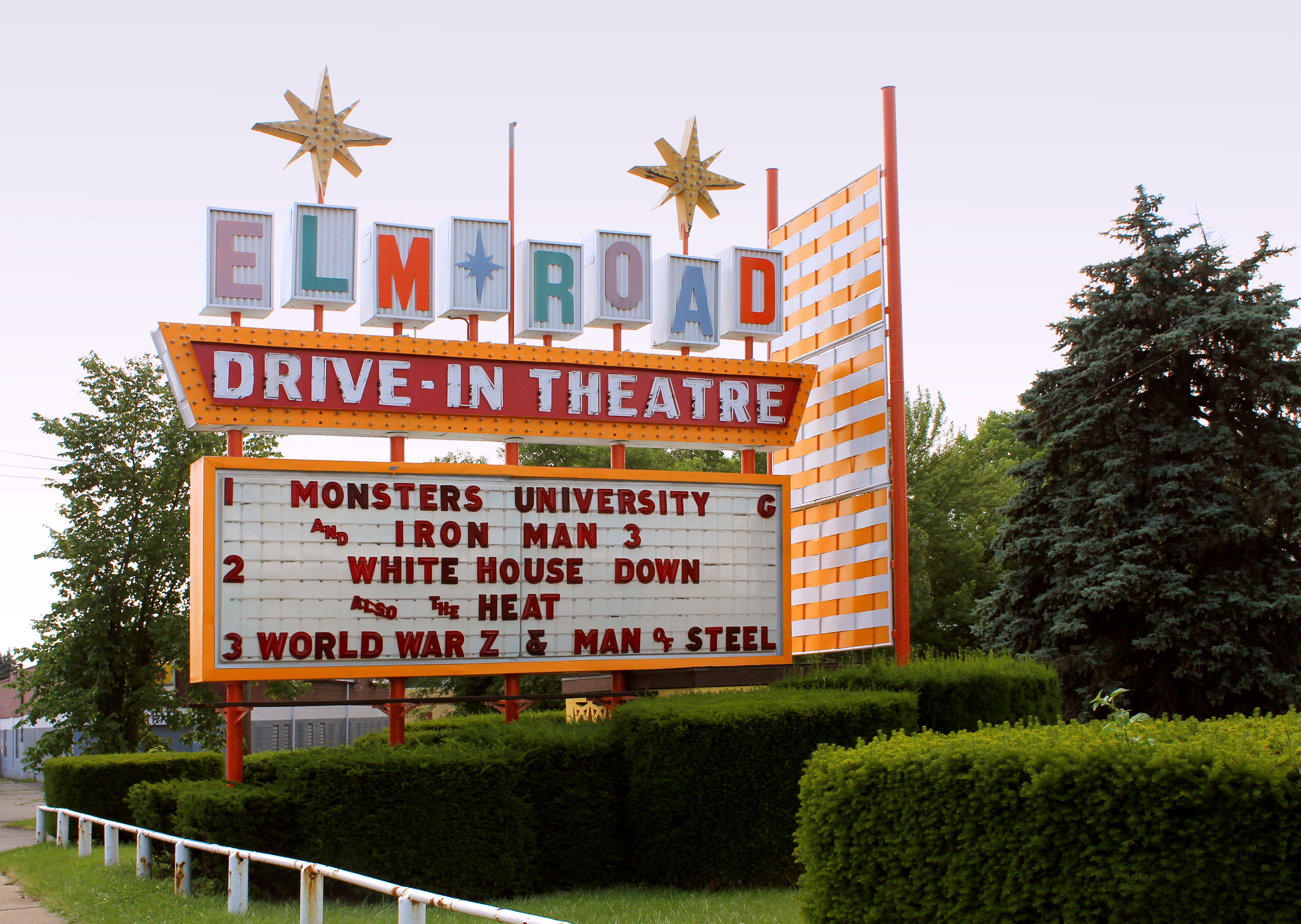
Classic Googie sign at Warren, Ohio drive-in

Googie's beginnings are with the Streamline Moderne architecture of the 1930s. Alan Hess, one of the most knowledgeable writers on the subject, writes in Googie: Ultra Modern Road Side Architecture that mobility in Los Angeles during the 1930s was characterized by the initial influx of the automobile and the service industry that evolved to cater to it. With car ownership increasing, cities no longer had to be centered on a central downtown but could spread out to the suburbs, where business hubs could be interspersed with residential areas. The suburbs offered less congestion by offering the same businesses, but accessible by car. Instead of one main store downtown, businesses now had multiple stores in suburban areas. This new trend required owners and architects to develop a visual imagery so customers would recognize it from the road. This modern consumer architecture was based on communication.

The new smaller suburban drive-in restaurants were essentially architectural signboards advertising the business to vehicles on the road. This was achieved by using bold style choices, including large pylons with elevated signs, bold neon letters and circular pavilions. Hess writes that because of the increase in mass production and travel during the 1930s, Streamline Moderne became popular because of the high energy silhouettes its sleek designs created. These buildings featured rounded edges, large pylons and neon lights, all symbolizing, according to Hess, "invisible forces of speed and energy", that reflect the influx of mobility that cars, locomotives and zeppelins brought.

Streamline Moderne, much like Googie, was styled to look futuristic to signal the beginning of a new era – that of the automobile and other technologies. Drive-in services such as diners, movie theaters and filling stations built with the same principles developed to serve the new American city. Drive-ins had advanced car-oriented architectural design, as they were built with an expressive utilitarian style, circular and surrounded by a parking lot, allowing all customers equal access from their cars. These developments in consumer-oriented design set the stage for Googie during the 1950s, since during the 1940s World War II and rationing caused a pause of development because of the imposed frugality on the American public.

With the increasing prosperity of the United States during the 1950s, however, American designers celebrated this new affluence with optimistic designs. The development of nuclear power and the reality of spaceflight captivated the public's imagination of the future. Googie architecture exploited this trend by incorporating energy into its design with elements such as the boomerang, diagonals, atomic bursts and bright colors. According to Hess, commercial architecture was influenced by the desires of the mass audience. The public was captivated by rocket ships and nuclear energy, so, in order to draw their attention, architects used these as motifs in their work. Buildings had been used to catch the attention of motorists since the invention of the car, but during the 1950s the style became more widespread.

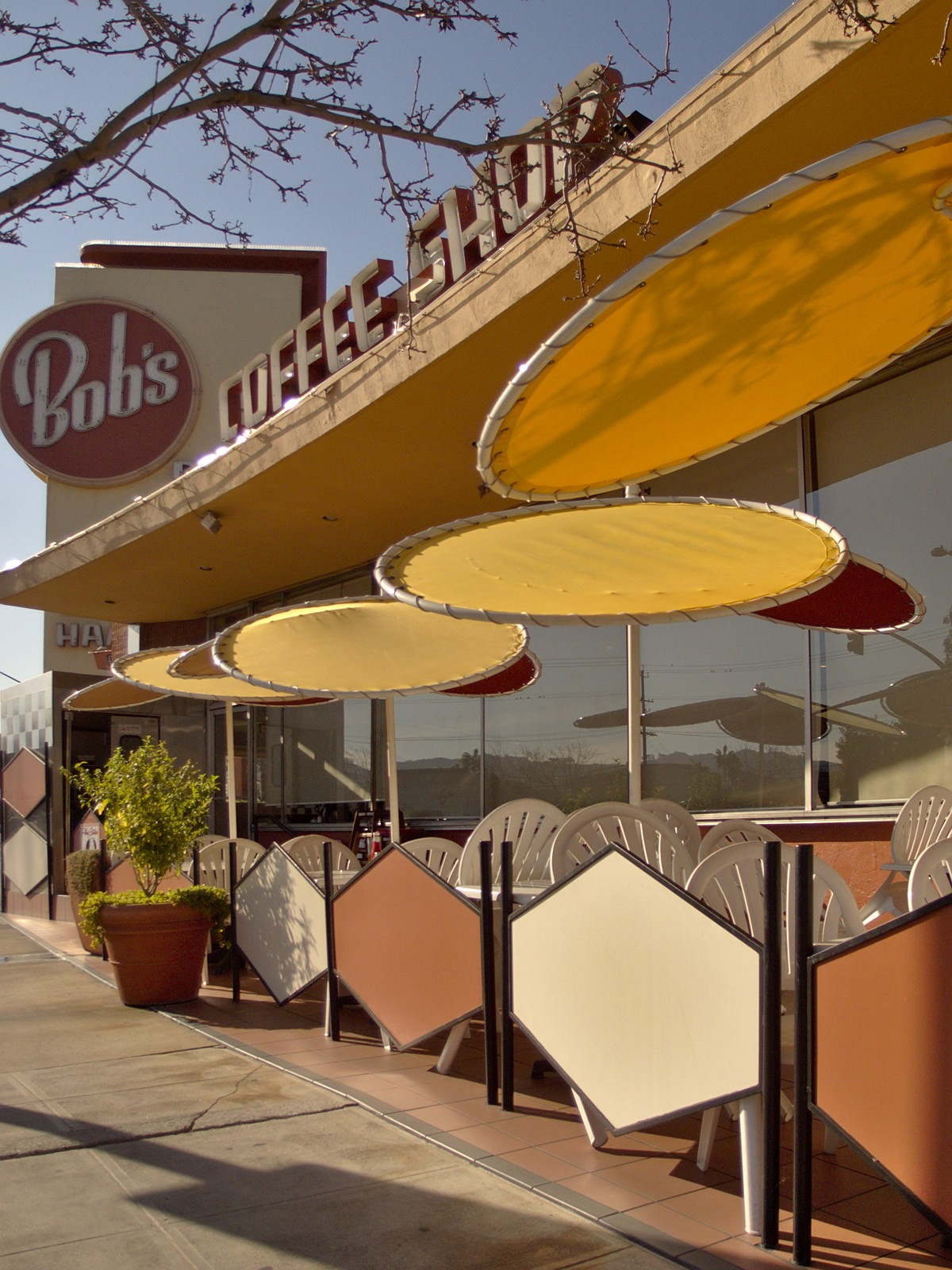
Patio tables at the Bob's Big Boy restaurant in Burbank, California

The identity of the first architect to practice in the style is often disputed, though Wayne McAllister was one early and influential architect in starting the style with his 1949 Bob's Big Boy restaurant in Burbank. McAllister got his start designing fashionable restaurants in Southern California, which led to a series of Streamline Moderne drive-ins during the 1930s; though he did not have formal training as an architect, he had been offered a scholarship at the architecture school at the University of Pennsylvania because of his skill. McAllister developed a brand for coffee shop chains by developing a style for each client – which also allowed customers to easily recognize a store from the road.

Along with McAllister, the prolific Googie architects included John Lautner, Douglas Honnold, and the team of Louis Armet and Eldon Davis of Armet & Davis firm, which they founded in 1947. Also instrumental in developing the style was designer Helen Liu Fong, a member of the firm of Armet and Davis. Joining the firm during 1951, she created such Googie interiors as those of the Johnie's Coffee Shop on Wilshire Boulevard and Fairfax Avenue, the first Norms Restaurant, and the Holiday Bowl on Crenshaw Boulevard.

America's interest in spaceflight had a significant influence on the unique style of Googie architecture. During the 1950s, space travel became a reality for the first time in history. In 1957 the Soviet Union launched Sputnik I, the first human-made satellite to achieve Earth orbit. The Soviet Union then launched Vostok 1 carrying the first human, Yuri Gagarin, into Earth orbit in 1961. The Eisenhower and Kennedy administrations made competing with the Soviets for dominance in space a national priority of considerable urgency and importance. This marked the beginning of the so-called "Space Race".

Googie-style signs usually boast sharp and bold angles, intended to suggest the aerodynamic features of a rocket ship. Also, at the time, the unique architecture was a form of architectural expressionism, as space rockets were technological novelties at the time.

== Characteristics ==
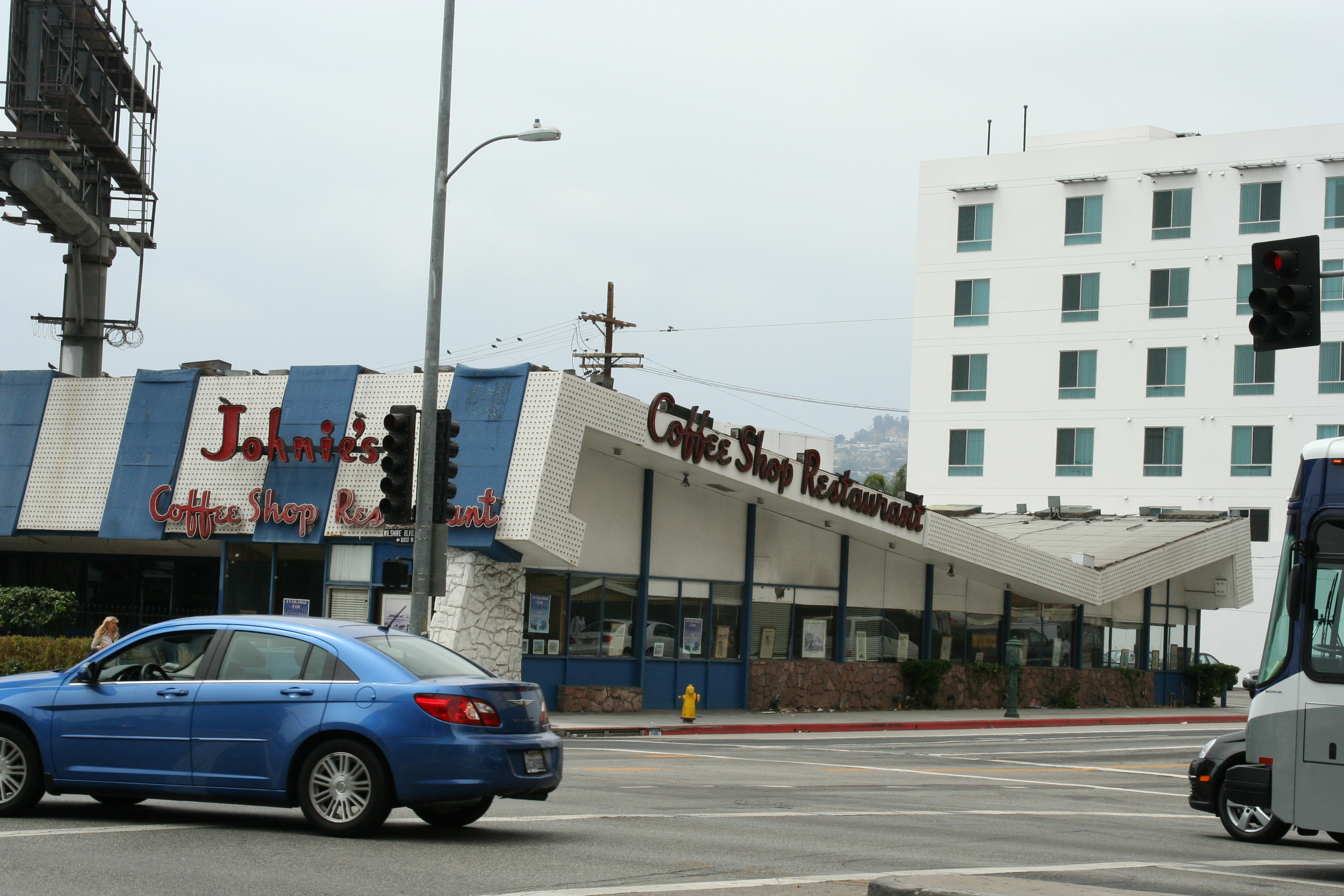
Johnie's Coffee Shop on Wilshire Boulevard, Los Angeles, designed by Armet & Davis

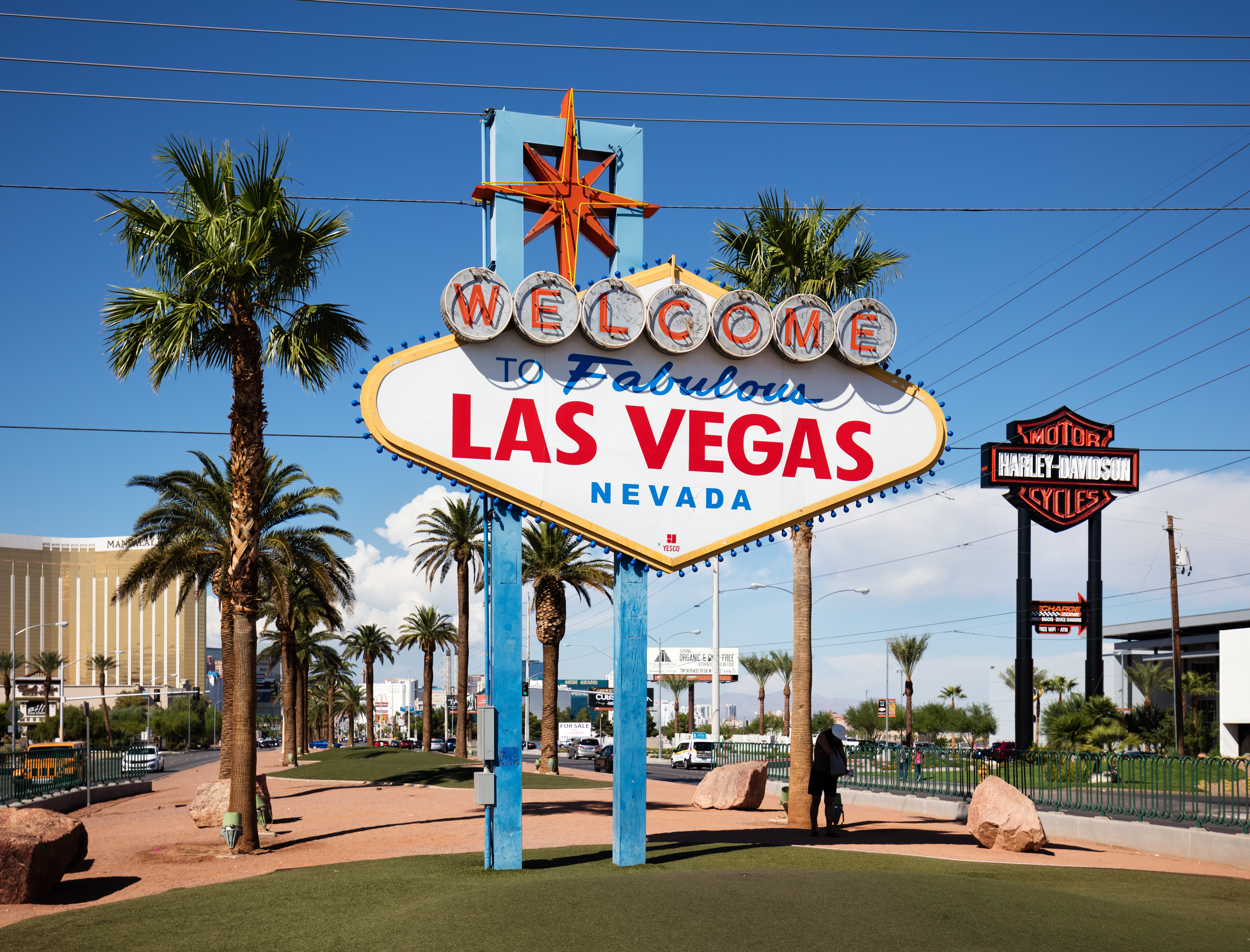
Welcome to Fabulous Las Vegas sign

Cantilevered structures, acute angles, illuminated plastic paneling, freeform boomerang and artist's palette shapes and cutouts, and tailfins on buildings marked Googie architecture, which was contemptible to some architects of then-current High Art Modernism, but had defenders during the post-Modern period at the end of the 20th century. The common elements that generally distinguish Googie from other forms of architecture are:

- Roofs sloping at an upward angle: This is the one particular element in which architects were creating a unique structure. Many Googie style coffee shops, and other structures, have a roof that appears to be 2/3 of an inverted obtuse triangle. An example of this is the famous, but now closed, Johnie's Coffee Shop on Wilshire Boulevard in Los Angeles.
- Starbursts: Starbursts are an ornament that is common with the Googie style, showing its Space Age and whimsical influences. Perhaps the most notable example of the starburst appears on the "Welcome to Fabulous Las Vegas" sign. The ornamental design is in the form of, as Hess writes, "a high-energy explosion". This shape is an example of non-utilitarian design, as the star shape has no actual function but merely serves as a design element.

The boomerang shape was another design element that captured movement. It was used structurally in place of a pillar or aesthetically as a stylized arrow. Hess writes that the boomerang was a stylistic rendering of a directional energy field.

Editor Douglas Haskell described the abstract Googie style, saying that "If it looks like a bird, this must be a geometric bird." Also, the buildings must appear to defy gravity, as Haskell noted: "whenever possible, the building must hang from the sky". Haskell's third tenet for Googie was that it have more than one theme—more than one structural system. Because of its need to be noticed from moving automobiles along the commercial strip, Googie was not a style noted for its subtlety.

One of the more famous Googie buildings is the Theme Building at Los Angeles International Airport (LAX), designed by James Langenheim of William Pereira and Charles Luckman and built during 1961.

One of the remaining Googie-styled drive-in restaurants, Harvey's Broiler (Paul Clayton, 1958), later Johnie's Broiler in Downey, California, was partially demolished in 2006. However, through the efforts of citizens, the city of Downey, and historic preservationists, the structure was rebuilt and reopened in 2009 as a Bob's Big Boy restaurant.

Another remaining example of Googie architecture still in operation is the Dulles International Airport Main Terminal, designed by Eero Saarinen in 1958. This terminal exemplifies the dramatic roof slope, large windows, and generous use of concrete, somewhat similar to Saarinen's TWA Flight Center.

== Districts ==
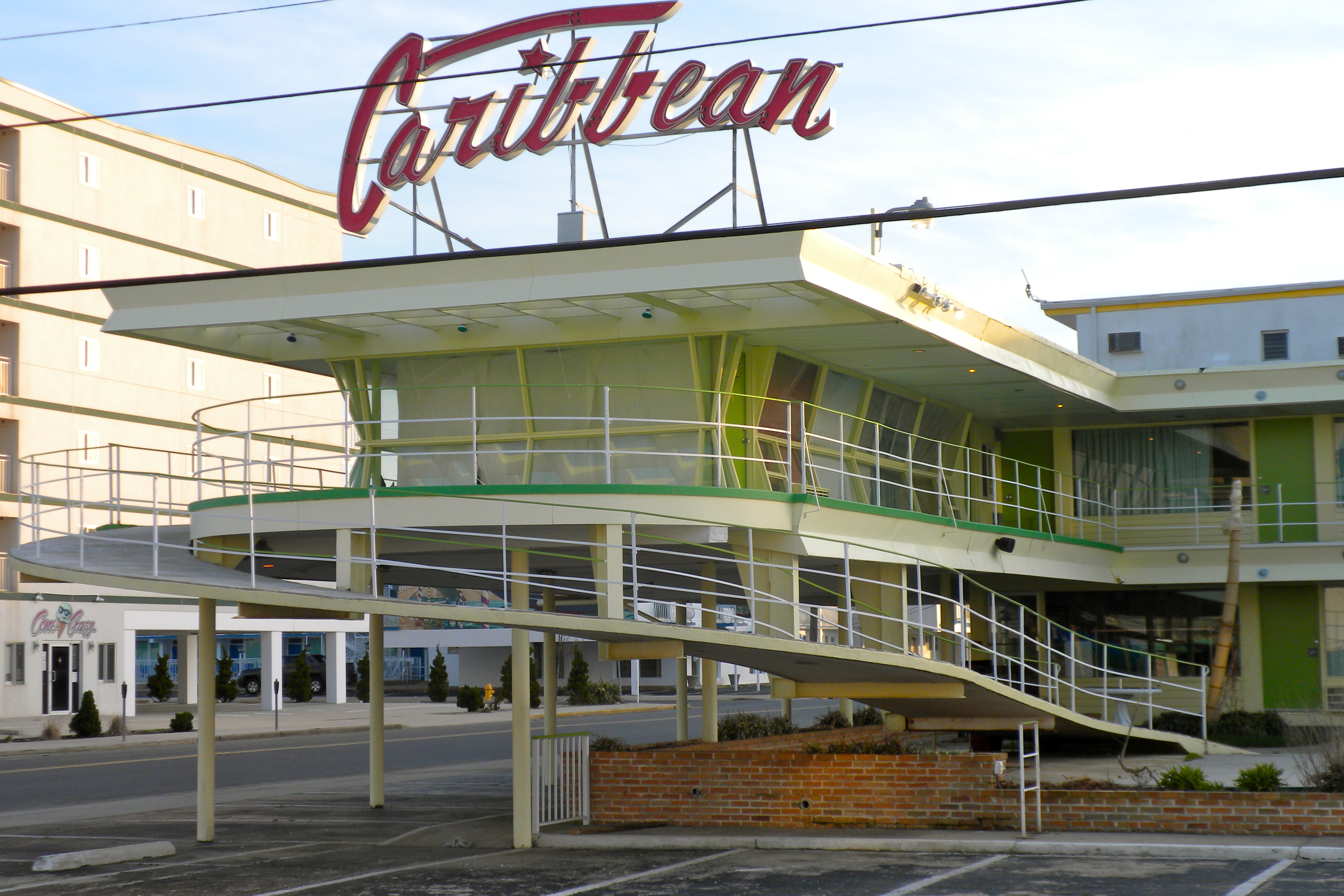
The Caribbean Motel in Wildwood, New Jersey's Wildwoods Shore Resort Historic District

Classic locations for Googie style buildings are Miami Beach, Florida, where secondary commercial structures were adapted from the resort style of Morris Lapidus and other hotel designers; the first phase of Las Vegas, Nevada; and their birthplace of Southern California.

=== Wildwood, New Jersey ===
The beachfront resort town of Wildwood, New Jersey, features an array of motel designs, colorfully described by such sub-styles as Vroom, Pu-Pu Platter, Phony Colonee and more. The district is known collectively as the Wildwoods Shore Resort Historic District by the State of New Jersey.

The term "doo-wop" was used by New Jersey's Mid-Atlantic Center for the Arts during the early 1990s to describe the unique, space-age architectural style. Many of Wildwood's Doo-Wop motels were built by Lou Morey, who specialized in such designs. His Ebb Tide Motel, built during 1957 and demolished during 2003, is credited as the first Doo-Wop motel in Wildwood Crest.

=== Los Angeles, California ===
An iconic example of the Googie style building in Los Angeles is the Hollywood Premiere Motel designed by Joyce Miller. The motel is situated on Hollywood Blvd. In 2025, the motel became a LA Historic-Cultural Monument, becoming the city's first landmark motel.

== Decline and preservation ==
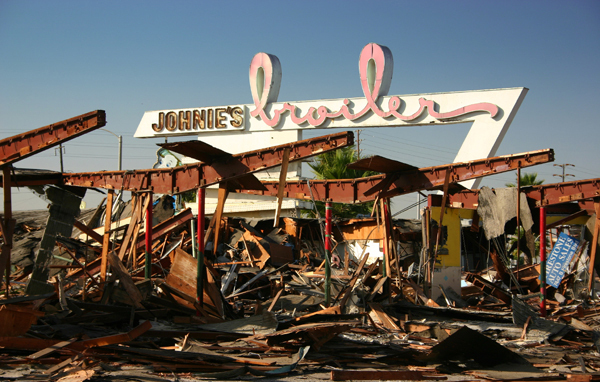
Many Googie structures have fallen into disrepair or been destroyed. After its demolition on January 7, 2007, this Johnie's Broiler restaurant was later rebuilt incorporating the surviving architectural elements.

After the 1960s, following the Apollo 11 Moon landing, the rise of ecology movements against nuclear power, and the de-escalations of the Space Race and the Atomic Age, Googie began to fall out of style. The architectural community rarely appreciated or accepted Googie, considering it too flashy and vernacular for academic praise, and so the architecture of the 1970s, especially the International Style, shunned Googie. As Hess notes, beginning during the 1970s, commercial buildings were meant to blend into the urban environment and not attract attention. By the mid 1960s, the novelty of Googie was starting to wane and there was a backlash against the flashy style.

Since Googie buildings were usually part of the service industry, most developers did not think they were worth preserving as cultural artifacts. The publication of Googie by Alan Hess in 1986 inspired a new appreciation for the style. Despite the humble origins of Googie, Hess writes that, "Googie architecture is an important part of the history of suburbia." Googie was a symbol of the early days of car culture.

One of the earliest organizations in the US that advocated for the preservation of Googie architecture was the Los Angeles Conservancy Modern Committee, which was formed in 1984 in response to the demolition of Ship's coffee shop in Westwood and Tiny Naylor's Drive-In in Hollywood. Despite the loss of these and the original Googie's in Hollywood, other Googie coffee shops including Norms Restaurants, Johnie's Coffee Shop, and the Wich Stand have received historic designations. The world's oldest McDonald's in Downey and the earliest remaining Bob's Big Boy, in Burbank, have also been preserved and restored.

In Wildwood, New Jersey, a "Doo Wop Preservation League" works with local business and property owners, city planning and zoning officials, and the state's historic preservation office, to help ensure that the remaining historic structures will be preserved. Wildwood's high-rise hotel district has been the first in the US to enforce "Doo Wop" design guidelines for new construction.

== Neo-Googie architecture ==
The architect Michael Hsu designed multiple restaurants for the Austin-based restaurant P. Terry's in the Googie style. Each location is uniquely designed, featuring oblique shapes, color, and large geometric roofs.

== Influence ==
Googie architecture developed from the futuristic architecture of Streamline Moderne, extending and reinterpreting technological themes for the new conditions of the 1950s. While 1930s architecture was relatively simple, Googie embraced opulence. Hess argues that the reason for this was that the vision of the future of the 1930s was obsolete by 1950 and thus the architecture evolved along with it. During the 1930s, Streamlined trains and Lincoln-Zephyrs had been advanced technology, and Streamline Moderne paralleled their smooth simplified aerodynamic exteriors. That simplicity may have represented the Depression era's forced frugality.

The eye-catching Googie style flourished in a carnival atmosphere along multi-lane highways, in motel architecture and above all in commercial signage. The influence of Googie was prominently seen in the architecture and signage of Los Angeles and Las Vegas circa 1945–1970, where many of the same architects who designed Googie coffee shops in Los Angeles went on to design some of the seminal hotels and casinos in Las Vegas. Private clients were the main patrons of Googie. Ultimately, the style became unfashionable and, over time, numerous examples of the Googie style have either fallen into disrepair or been destroyed completely.

The exaggerated, once-futuristic Googie style exemplified in The Jetsons cartoons and the original Disneyland (which featured a Googie Tomorrowland) gave birth several decades later to retrofuturism. Googie was also the inspiration for the background art style of animated television series and movies such as Dexter's Laboratory, Johnny Bravo, The Powerpuff Girls, Futurama, George Shrinks, The Adventures of Jimmy Neutron: Boy Genius, My Life as a Teenage Robot, and The Incredibles, as well as the cover of the faux-memoir Based on a True Story by comedian Norm Macdonald.

== See also ==
- List of Googie architecture structures:

- Canada
- United States

- Covina Bowl
- Palos Verdes Bowl
- Space Needle
- 1950s American automobile culture
- 1964 New York World's Fair
- Atomic Age (design)
- Fantastic architecture
- Home of the future
- Miami Modern architecture
- Novelty architecture
- Raygun Gothic
- Tiki culture
- Colonel Bleep
- Design for Dreaming
- UPA (animation studio)
