= Gablet =

Gablet may refer to:

- Gablet roof or Dutch gable, a roof with a small gable above a hipped roof
- Gablet, an architectural term for a triangular termination to a buttress
