= Francis M. Kirkham House =

Historic house in Iowa, United States

- U.S. National Register of Historic Places
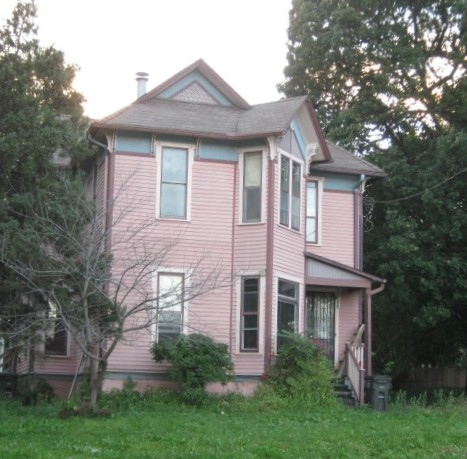

- Location within Iowa Location within the United States
- Location: 1026 24th St. Des Moines, Iowa
- Coordinates: 41°35′46″N 93°39′0.2″W
- Area: less than one acre
- Built: 1888
- Architectural style: Late Victorian
- MPS: Drake University and Related Properties in Des Moines, Iowa, 1881--1918 MPS
- NRHP reference No.: 88001328
- Added to NRHP: September 8, 1988

The Francis M. Kirkham House is a historic building located in Des Moines, Iowa, United States. It is a two-story dwelling that follows an irregular plan. It features a hipped roof with gablets, decorative wood shingles in the gable end, bargeboards, reeded panels that form the cornice, a gabled bay placed at an angle, bracketed eaves, and decorative window surrounds. The property on which it stands is a part of one of ten plats that were owned by Drake University. The University sold the lot to Francis M. Kirkham in 1886, and he had the house built by 1888 and resided in it. Kirkham was a Disciples of Christ minister and editor of the Christian Oracle. He was also one of the first trustees of Drake University. Its significance is attributed to the effect of the University's innovative financing techniques upon the settlement of the area around the campus. The house was listed on the National Register of Historic Places in 1988.
