= Professor Charles O. Denny House =

Historic house in Iowa, United States

- U.S. National Register of Historic Places
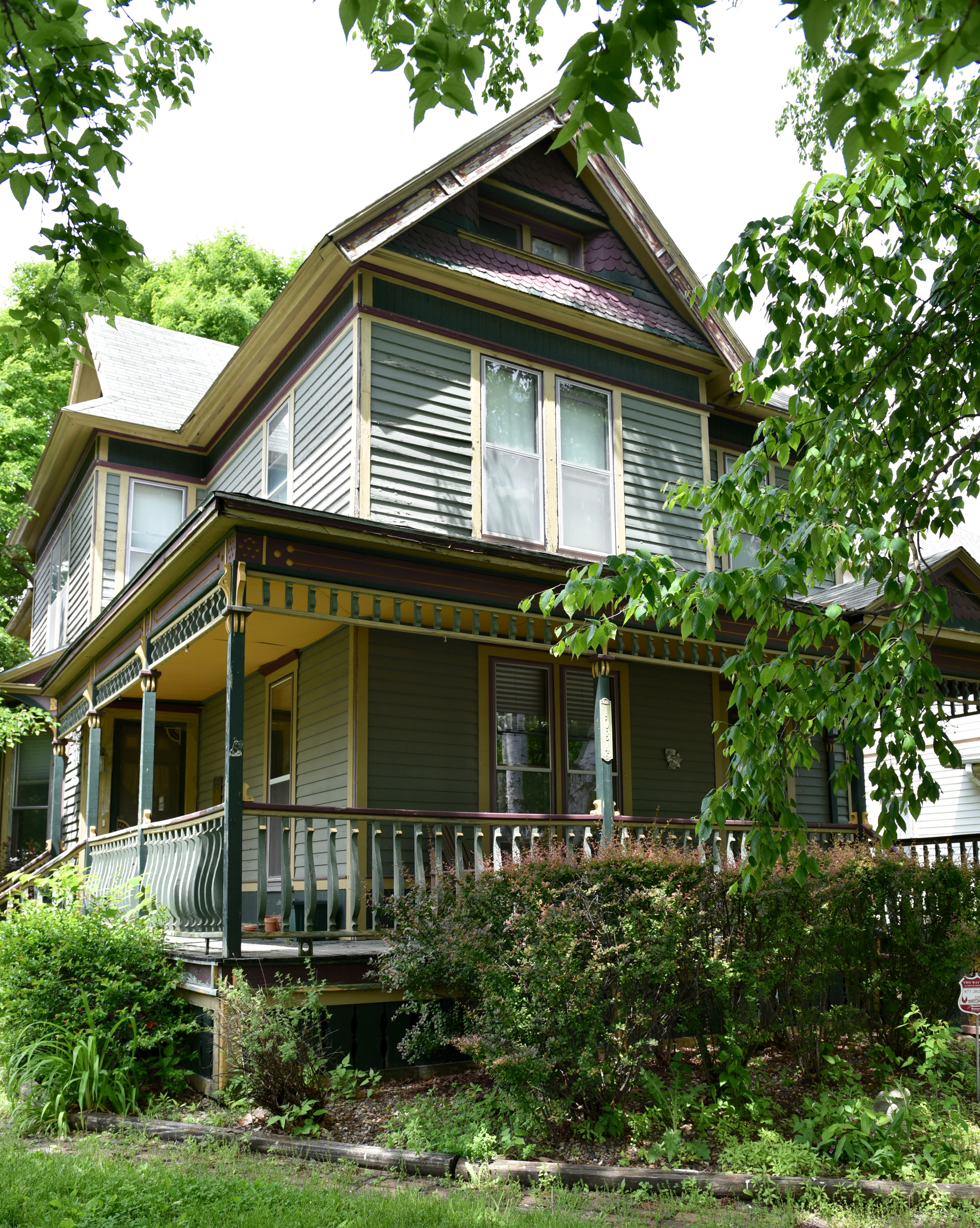

- Location within Iowa Location within the United States
- Location: 1084 25th St. Des Moines, Iowa
- Coordinates: 41°35′51.4″N 93°39′04.5″W
- Area: less than one acre
- Built: 1893
- Architectural style: Late Victorian
- MPS: Drake University and Related Properties in Des Moines, Iowa, 1881--1918 MPS
- NRHP reference No.: 88001329
- Added to NRHP: September 8, 1988

The Professor Charles O. Denny House is a historic building located in Des Moines, Iowa, United States. It is a 2½-story dwelling that follows an irregular plan. It features a hipped roof with gablets and additional gables, fishscale shingles, bargeboards, reeded panels that form the cornice, and a wraparound porch with a pedimented entry. The property on which it stands is one of ten plats that were owned by Drake University. The University sold the lot to C.O. Denny in 1892, and he had the house built the following year. Denny was a Latin professor at Drake and lived nearby. He seems to have bought the property for speculative purposes. Its significance is attributed to the effect of the University's innovative financing techniques upon the settlement of the area around the campus. The house was listed on the National Register of Historic Places in 1988.
