= List of roof shapes =

Roof shapes include flat (or shed), gabled, hipped, arched, domed, and a wide variety of other configurations detailed below.

Roof angles are an integral component of roof shape, and vary from almost flat to steeply pitched.

Roof shapes differ greatly from region to region, depending on the climate, materials available, customs, and many other considerations.

Roof terminology is not rigidly defined. Usages vary from region to region, nation to nation, and from one builder or architect to another.

== Roof shapes ==
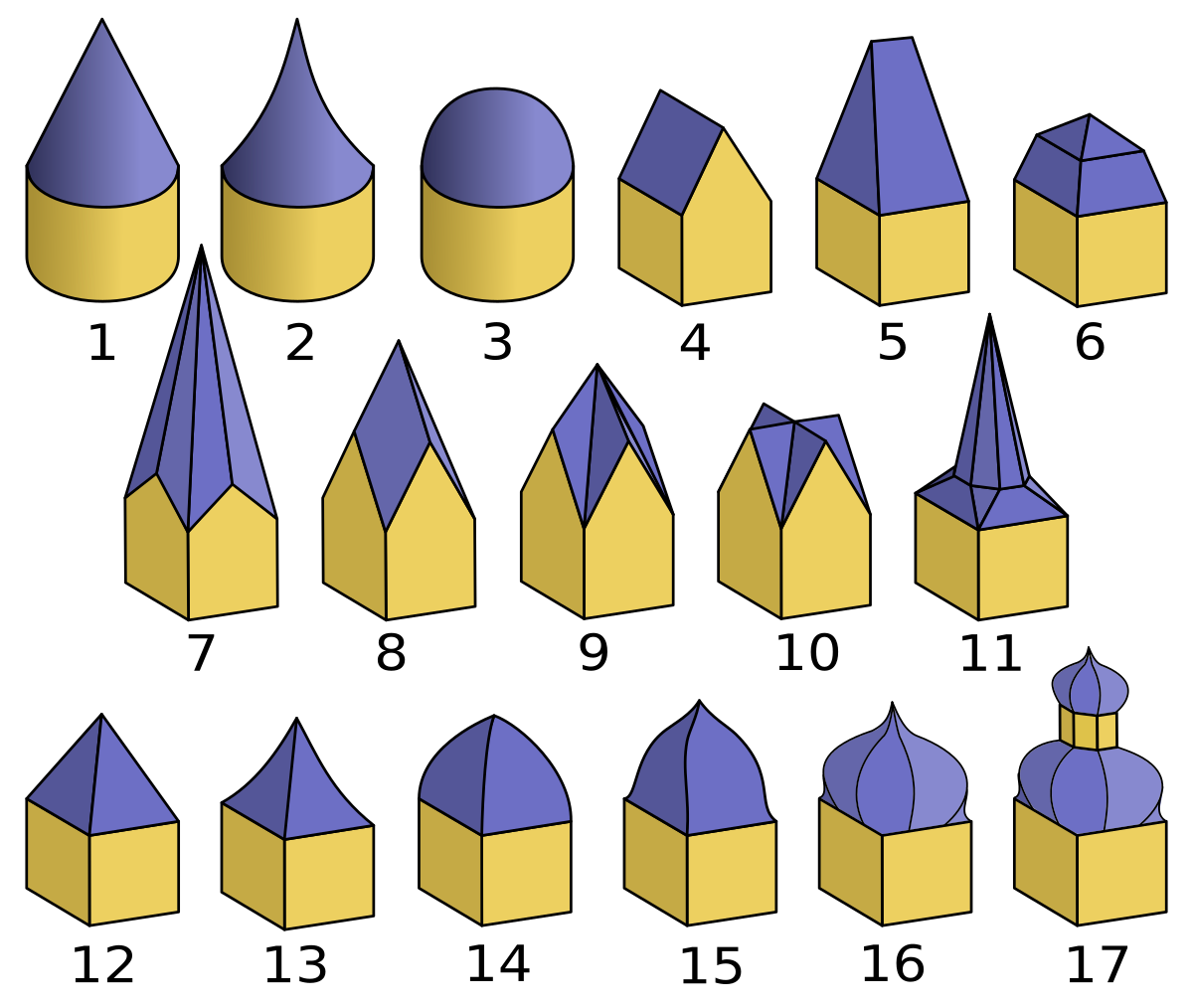
Towers, especially church towers, frequently feature special roof shapes: (1) Conical roof, (2) Concave conical roof, (3) Dome, (4) Gable roof, (5) Hip roof, (6) Mansard roof, (7) Helm roof, (8) Rhenish helm, (9) Folding roof, (10) Cross roof, (11) Broach spire, (12) Tented roof, (13) Concave tented roof, (14) Cloister vault, (15) Bell roof, (16) Onion Dome, (17) Welsh spire

- Flat: These are found in traditional buildings in regions with a low precipitation. Modern materials which are highly impermeable to water make possible the low-pitch roofs found on large commercial buildings. Although referred to as flat they are generally gently pitched.
  - Roof terrace (including roof garden)
- Single-pitched roof
  - Shed roof (lean-to, pent roof, skirt roof, outshot, skillion, mono-roof): A roof with one slope, historically attached to a taller wall.
  - Saw-tooth: Multiple single-pitched roofs arrayed in a row, sometimes seen on factories.
- Multi-pitched roof:
  - Gable (ridged, dual-pitched, peaked, saddle, pack-saddle, saddleback, span roof): A simple roof design shaped like an inverted V.
    - Cross gabled: The result of joining two or more gabled roof sections together, forming a T or L shape for the simplest forms, or any number of more complex shapes.
    - See also roof pitch, crow-stepped, corbie stepped, stepped gable: A gable roof with its end parapet walls below extended slightly upwards and shaped to resemble steps.
  - A-frame
  - Half-hipped (clipped gable, jerkinhead): A combination of a gable and a hip roof (pitched roof without changes to the walls) with the hipped part at the top and the gable section lower down.
  - Dutch gable, gablet: A hybrid of hipped and gable with the gable (wall) at the top and hipped lower down; i.e. the opposite arrangement to the half-hipped roof. Overhanging eaves forming shelter around the building are a consequence where the gable wall is in line with the other walls of the buildings; i.e., unless the upper gable is recessed.
  - Saltbox, catslide: A gable roof with one side longer than the other, and thus closer to the ground unless the pitch on one side is altered.
  - Bonnet roof: A reversed gambrel or Mansard roof with the lower portion at a lower pitch than the upper portion.
  - Monitor roof: A roof with a monitor; 'a raised structure running part or all of the way along the ridge of a double-pitched roof, with its own roof running parallel with the main roof.'
  - Butterfly roof (V-roof, London roof): A V-shaped roof resembling an open book. A kink separates the roof into two parts running towards each other at an obtuse angle.
  - Karahafu: A type of gable found in some traditional Japanese buildings.
  - Hidden roof: A type of Japanese roof construction.
  - Hip, hipped: A hipped roof is sloped in two pairs of directions (e.g. N–S and E–W) compared to the one pair of direction (e.g. N–S or E–W) for a gable roof.
  - Cross hipped: The result of joining two or more hip roof sections together, forming a T or L shape for the simplest forms, or any number of more complex shapes.
  - Satari: A Swedish variant on the monitor roof; a double hip roof with a short vertical wall usually with small windows, popular from the 17th century on formal buildings. (Säteritak in Swedish.)
  - Mansard (French roof): A roof with the pitch divided into a shallow slope above a steeper slope. The steep slope may be curved. An element of the Second Empire architectural style (Mansard style) in the U.S.
  - Neo-Mansard, Faux Mansard, False Mansard, Fake Mansard: Common in the 1960s and 70s in the U.S., these roofs often lack the double slope of the Mansard roof and are often steeply sloped walls with a flat roof. Unlike the Second Empire, where upper story windows were contained within dormers, Neo-Mansard roofs have window openings cut through the steep slope of the lower roof, forming a recessed window.
  - Gambrel, curb, kerb: A roof similar to a mansard but sloped in one direction rather than both.
  - Bell-cast (sprocketed, flared): A roof with the shallow slope below the steeper slope at the eaves. Compare with bell roof.
  - East Asian hip-and-gable roof
  - Mokoshi: A Japanese decorative pent roof
  - Pavilion roof : A low-pitched roof hipped equally on all sides and centered over a square or regular polygonal floor plan. The sloping sides rise to a peak. For steep tower roof variants use Pyramid roof.
  - Pyramid roof: A steep hip roof on a square building.
  - Pyatthat: A multi-tiered and spired roof commonly found in Burmese royal and Buddhist architecture.
  - Tented: A type of polygonal hipped roof with steeply pitched slopes rising to a peak
  - Helm roof, Rhenish helm: A pyramidal roof with gable ends; often found on church towers.
  - Spiral, a steeply pitched spire which twists as it goes up.
  - Barrel, barrel-arched (cradle, wagon): A round roof like a barrel (tunnel) vault.
  - Catenary: An arched roof in the form of a catenary curve.
  - Arched roof, bow roof, Gothic, Gothic arch, and ship's bottom roof. Historically also called a compass roof.
- Circular
  - Bell roof (bell-shaped, ogee, Philibert de l'Orme roof): A bell-shaped roof. Compare with bell-cast eaves.
  - Domed
  - Onion dome or rather an imperial roof
  - Bochka roof
  - Conical roof or cone roof
- Hyperbolic
  - Saddle

=== Illustrations ===
Flat roof

Single-pitched (shed, skillion) roof

Gable roof

Gable roof with catslide

Ridged, multi-gable or m-type roof

Gambrel roof

Clerestory roof

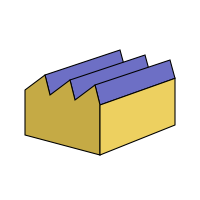
Saw-tooth roof

Hip roof

Half-hip roof

Tented or pavilion roof

Gablet roof or Dutch gable example with recessed (upper) gable and eaves

Rhombic roof/Rhenish helm

Arched roof

Barrel roof

Bow roof

Conical roof

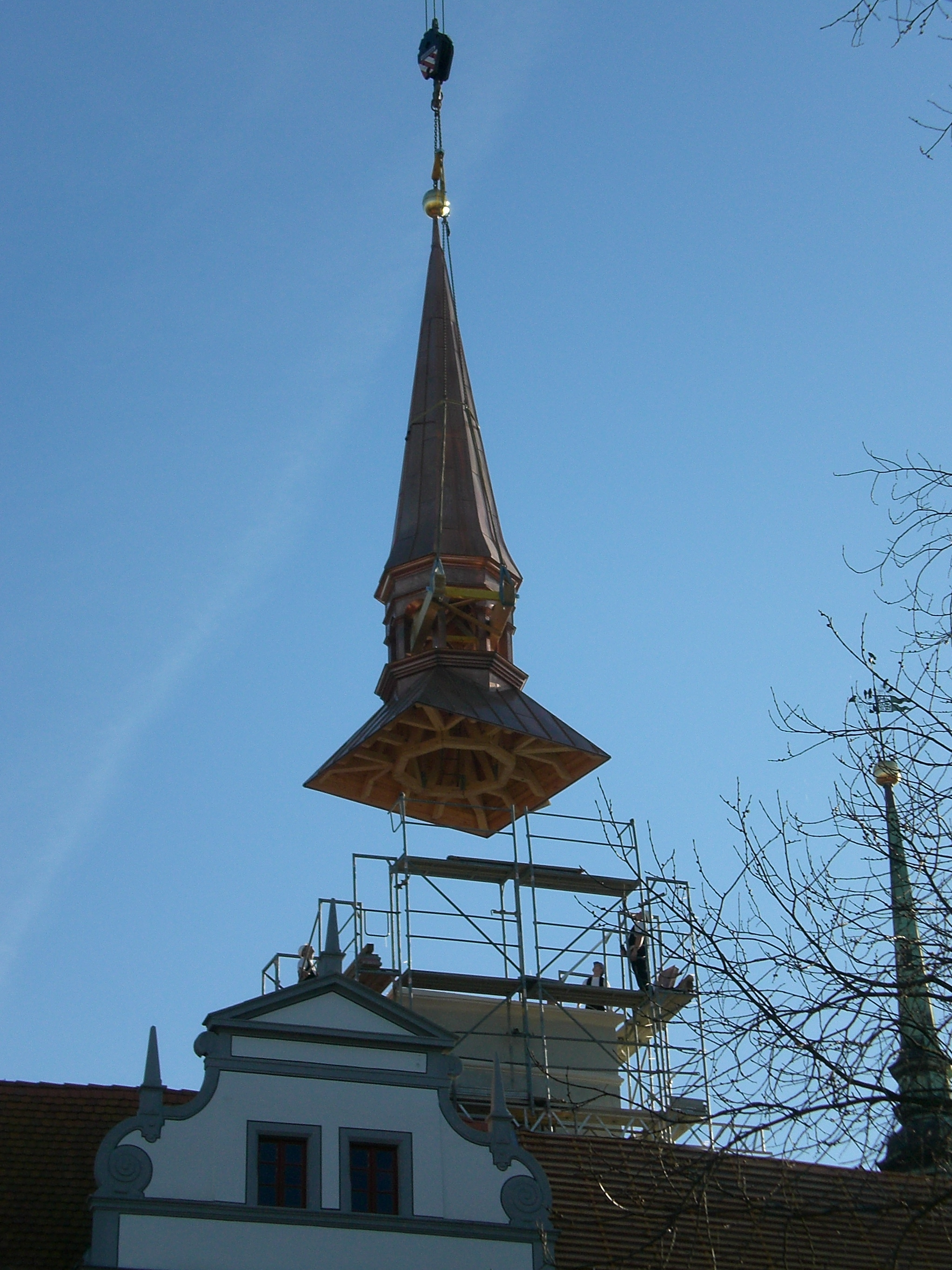
Spire

Onion dome

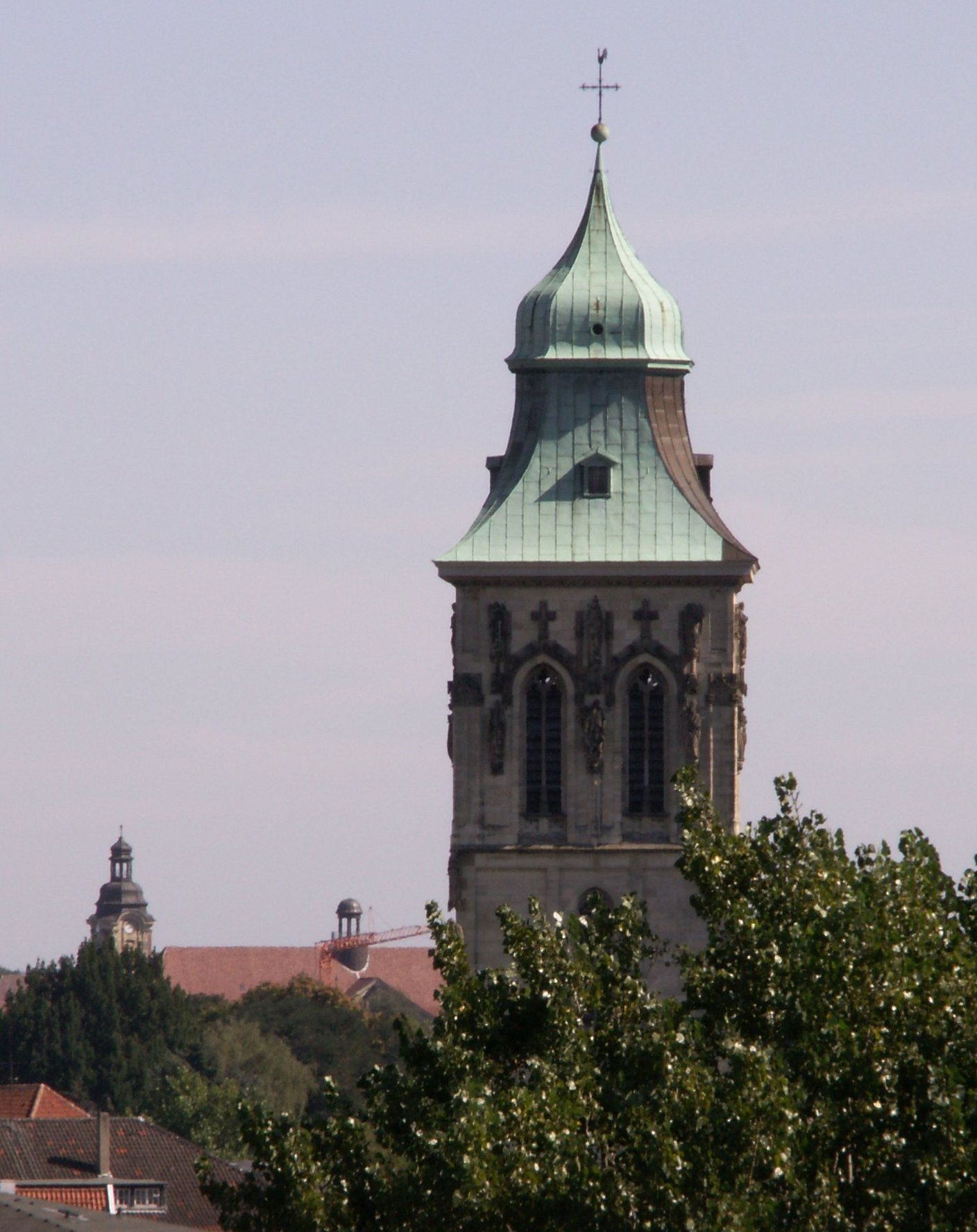
Welsh spire

Gable roof with eaves

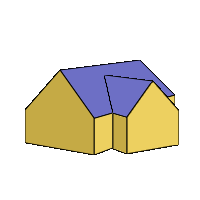
Cross-gabled building with squatter projecting wing and T-shaped plan

Hip and pent hip roof (Brit: hipped)

Butterfly roof or trough roof (rare)

Prow or "flying" Gable roof

Monitor roof

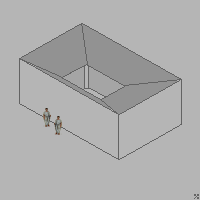
Compluvium roof

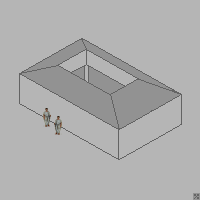
Displuvium roof (rare)

Hemisperical dome (on a wall)

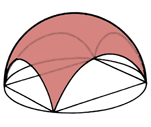
Sail vault

Compound dome

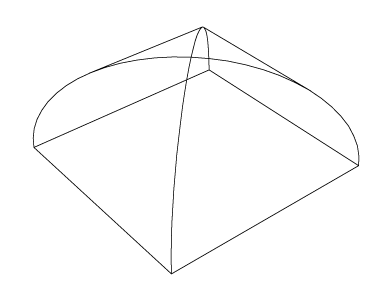
Cloister vault

== Selection criteria ==
- Climate
- Location
- Material availability
- Material cost
- Installation cost
- Neighbouring buildings
- Building geometry
- Aesthetics
- Engineering concerns
- Functionality
- Local customs
- restrictive covenants
- Building codes

== Gallery ==
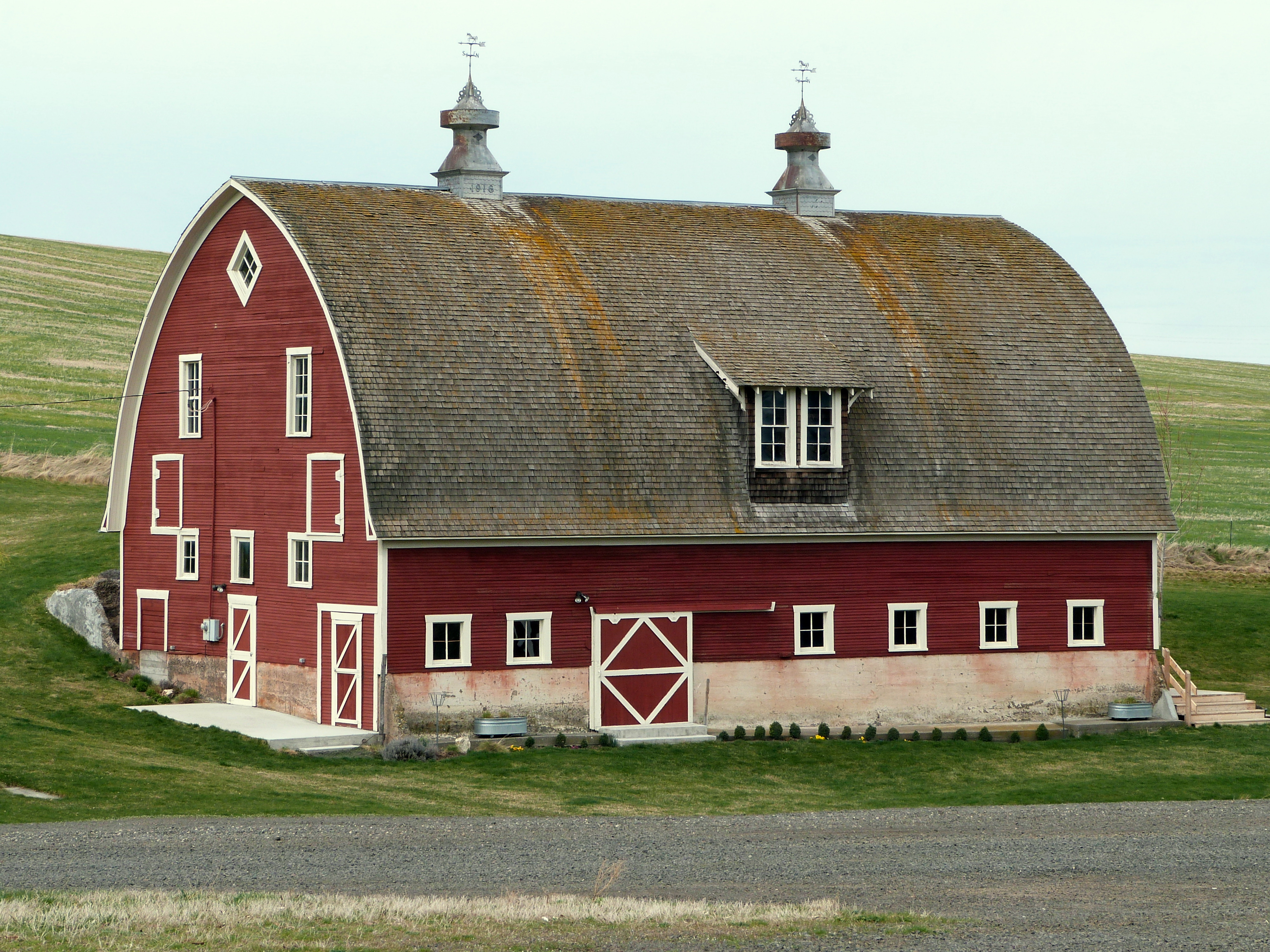
Arched roof, also called a Gothic arch, and ship's bottom roof, Weston, Oregon

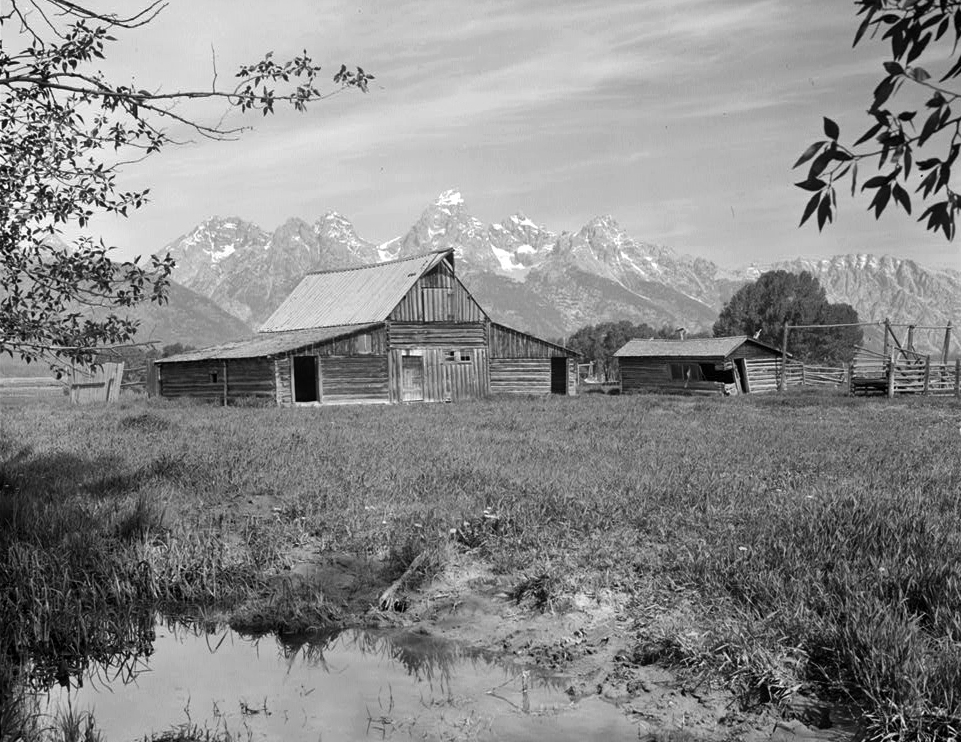
A bonnet roof with lower pitched lower slopes at a lower pitch, as seen on traditional barns in the western United States, Grand Teton National Park, Wyoming

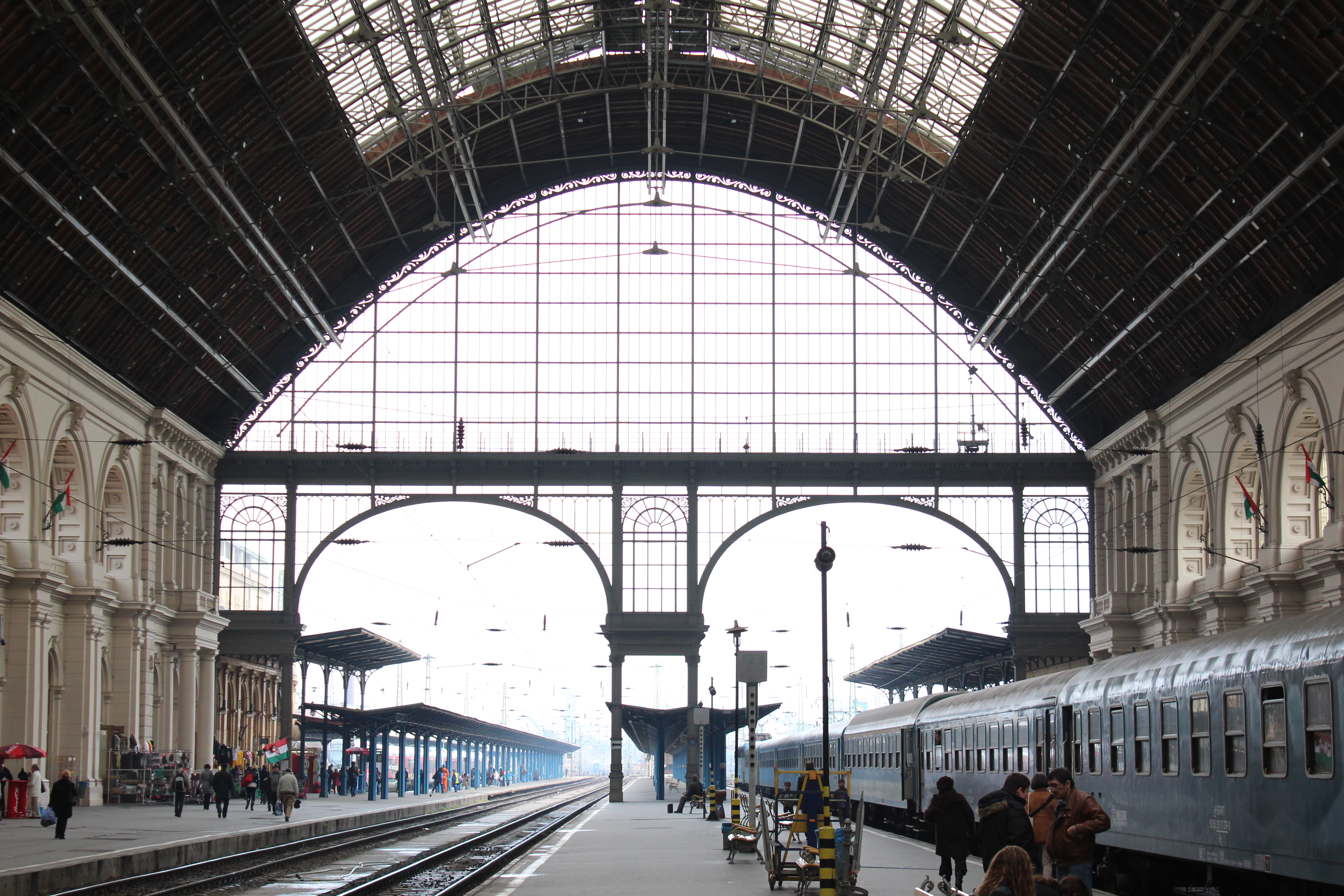
Parabolic curved roof, Keleti Railway Station, Budapest, Hungary

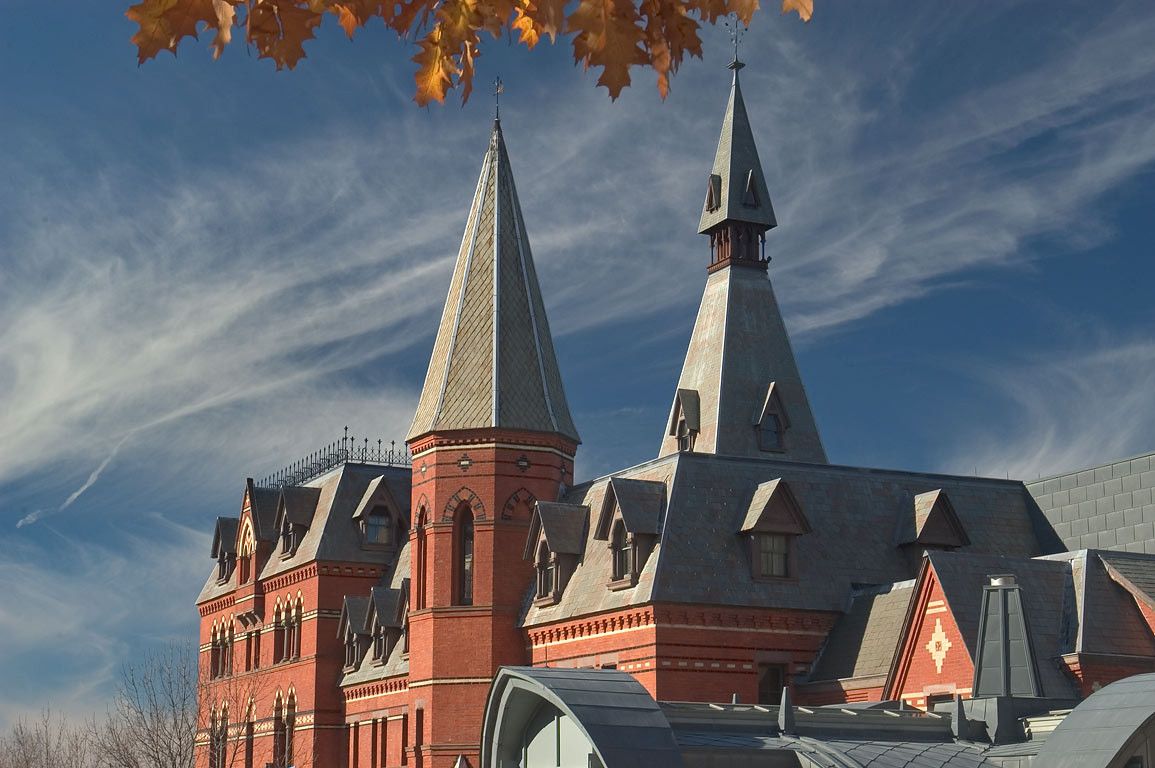
Collegiate Gothic style roof of the Sage Hall at Cornell Central Campus

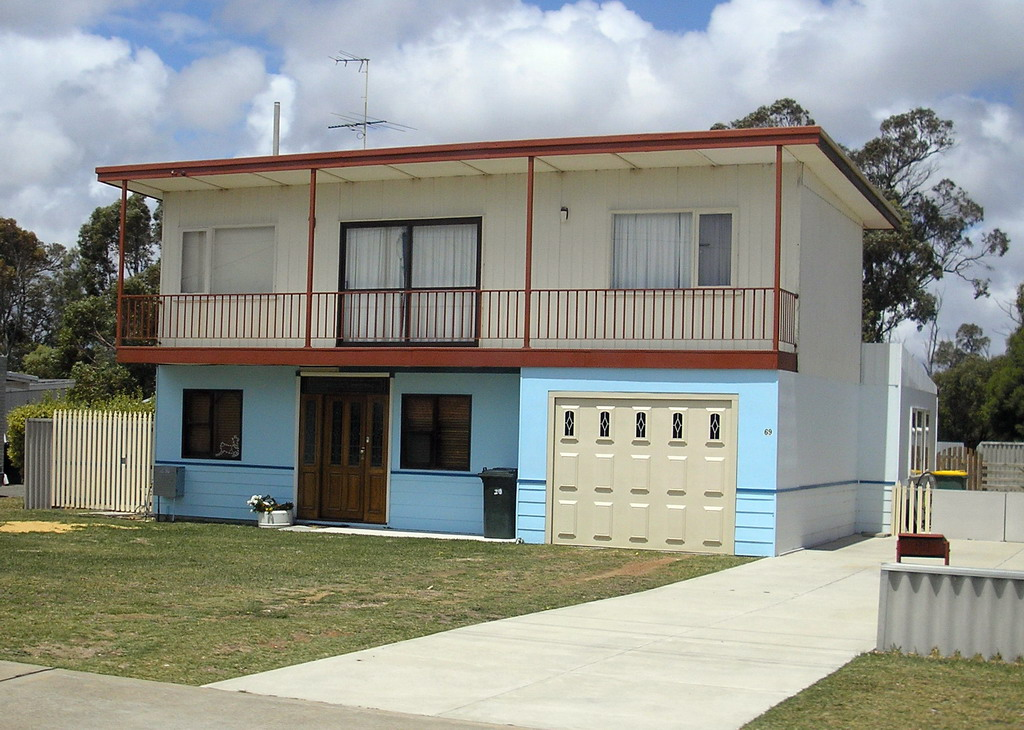
Flat roof, Western Australia

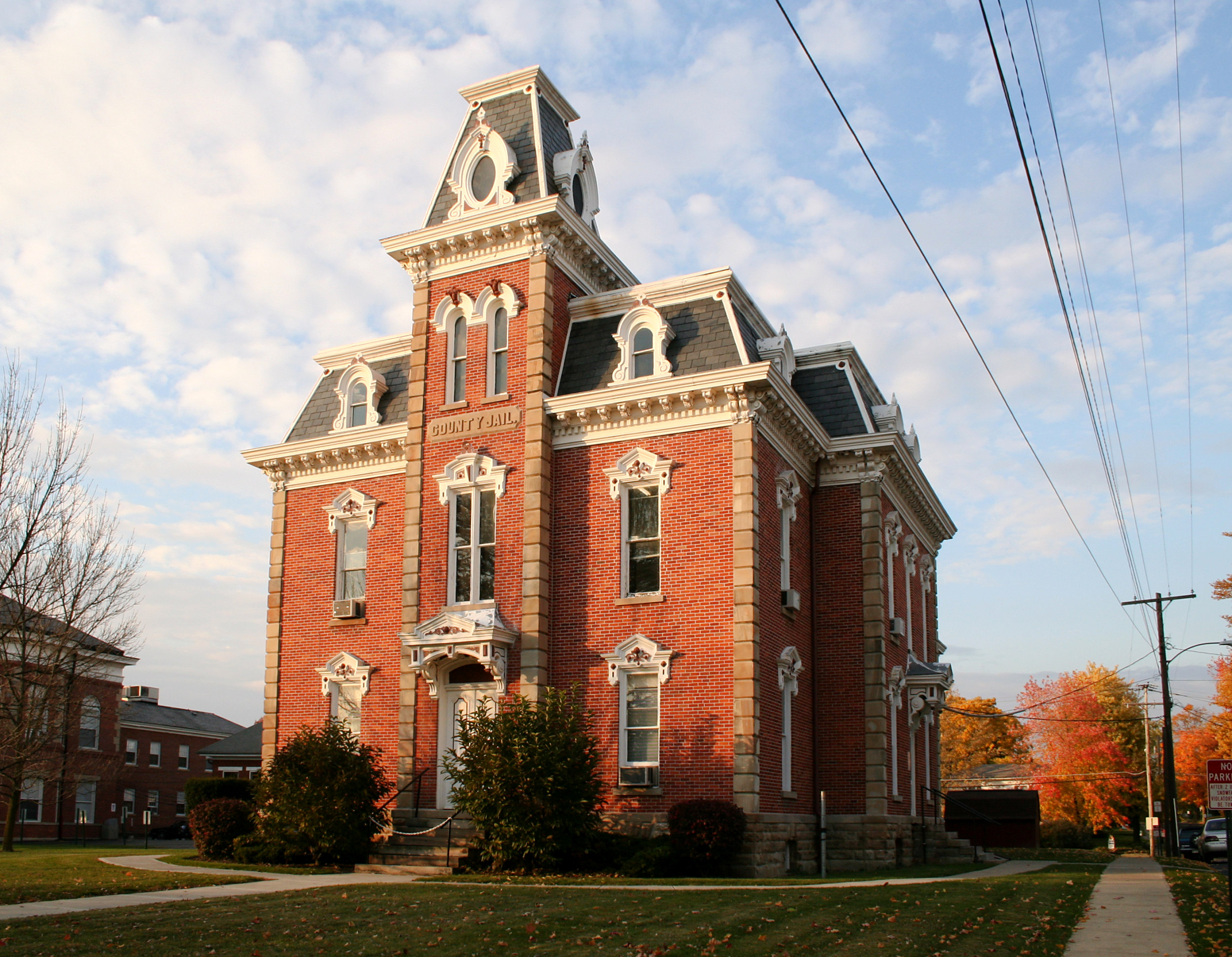
Mansard roof on a county jail, Mount Gilead, Ohio

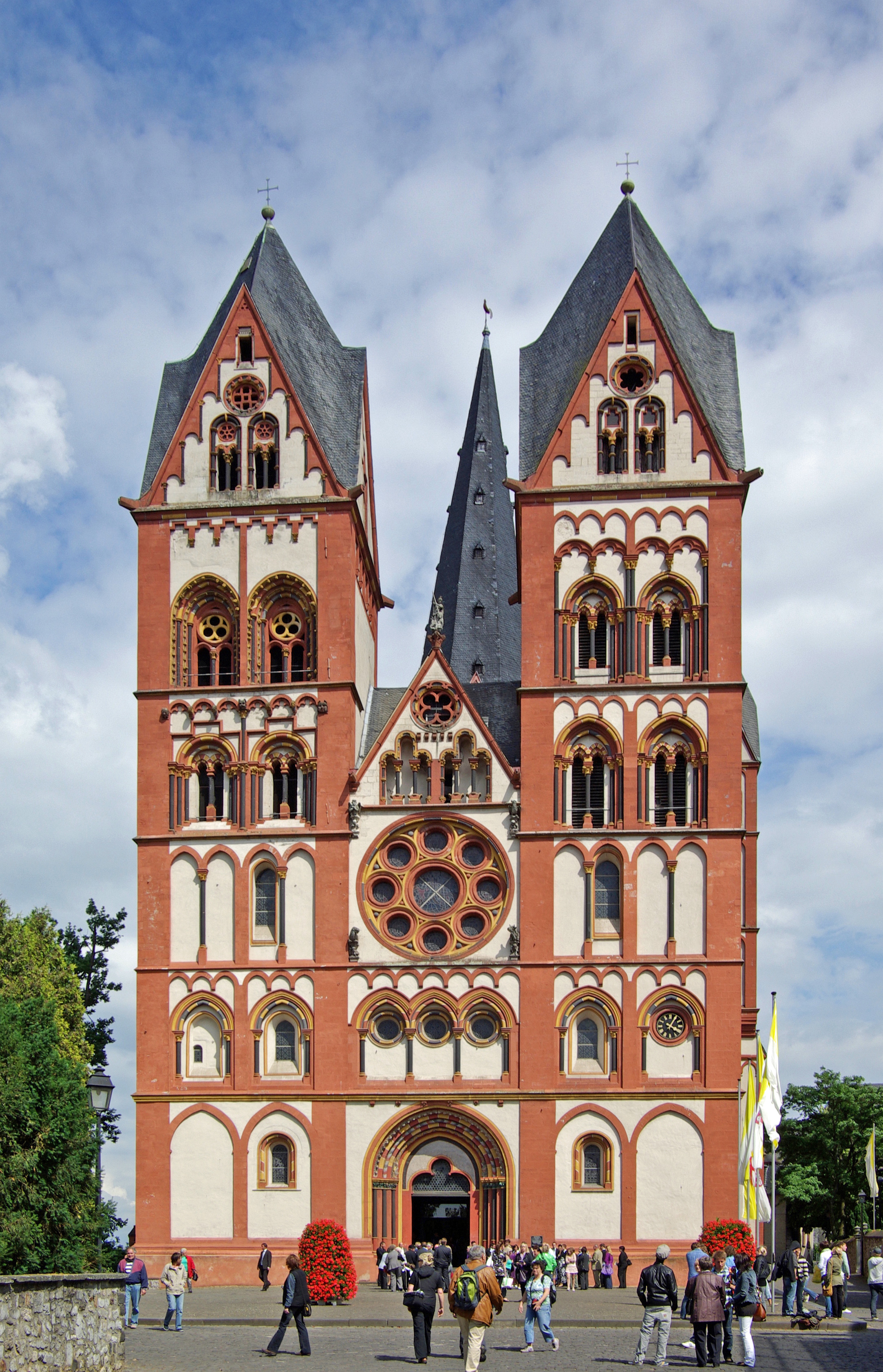
A helm roof on the towers of the Limburger Dom, Germany

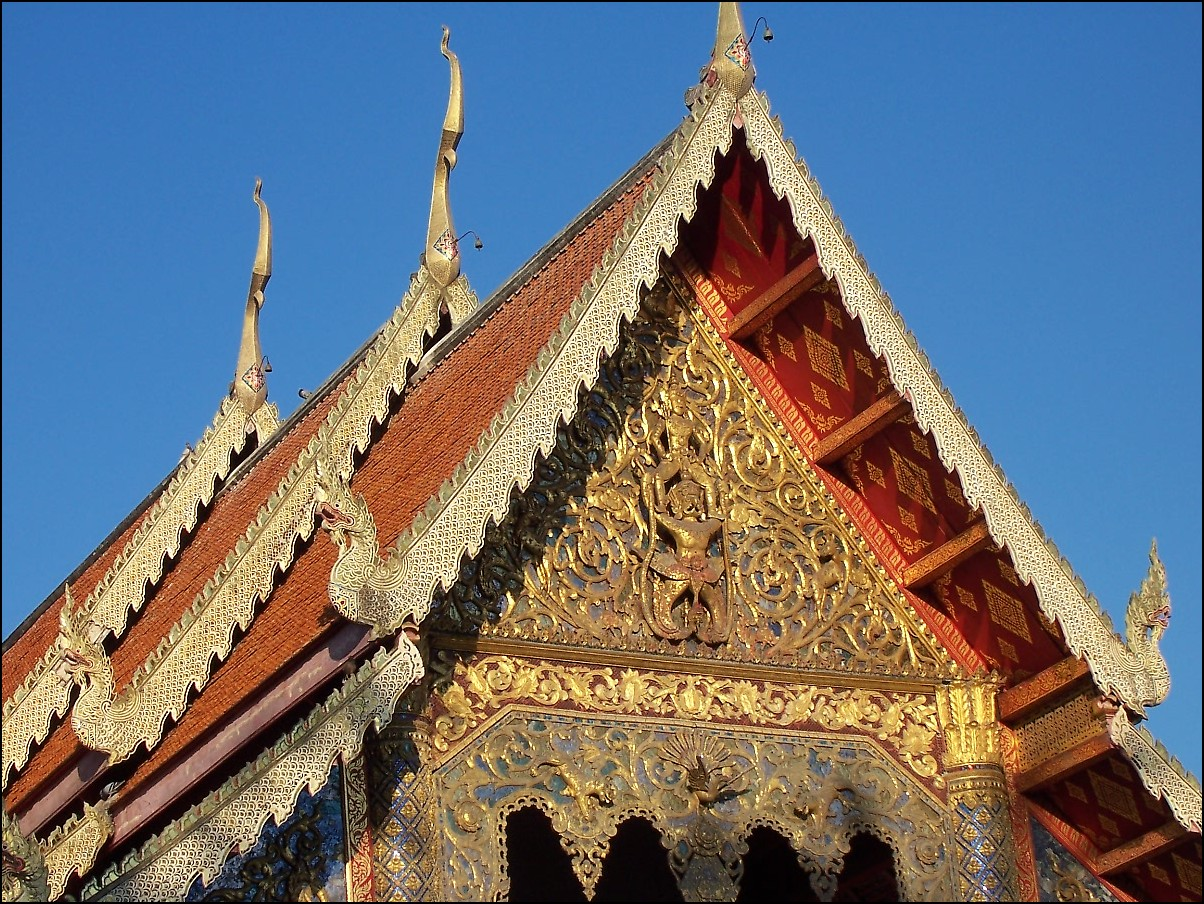
Gable roof with eaves, exposed, decorated rafters and soffits, and stepped ascending apexes, temple in Chiang Mai, Thailand.

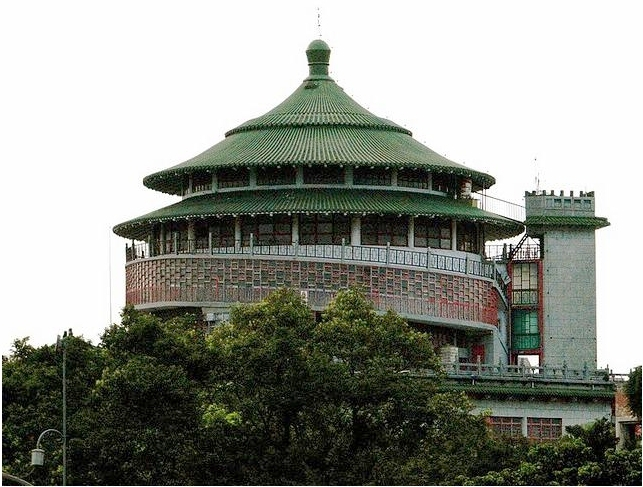
Conical Chinese roof, Nanhai Academy, Taipei

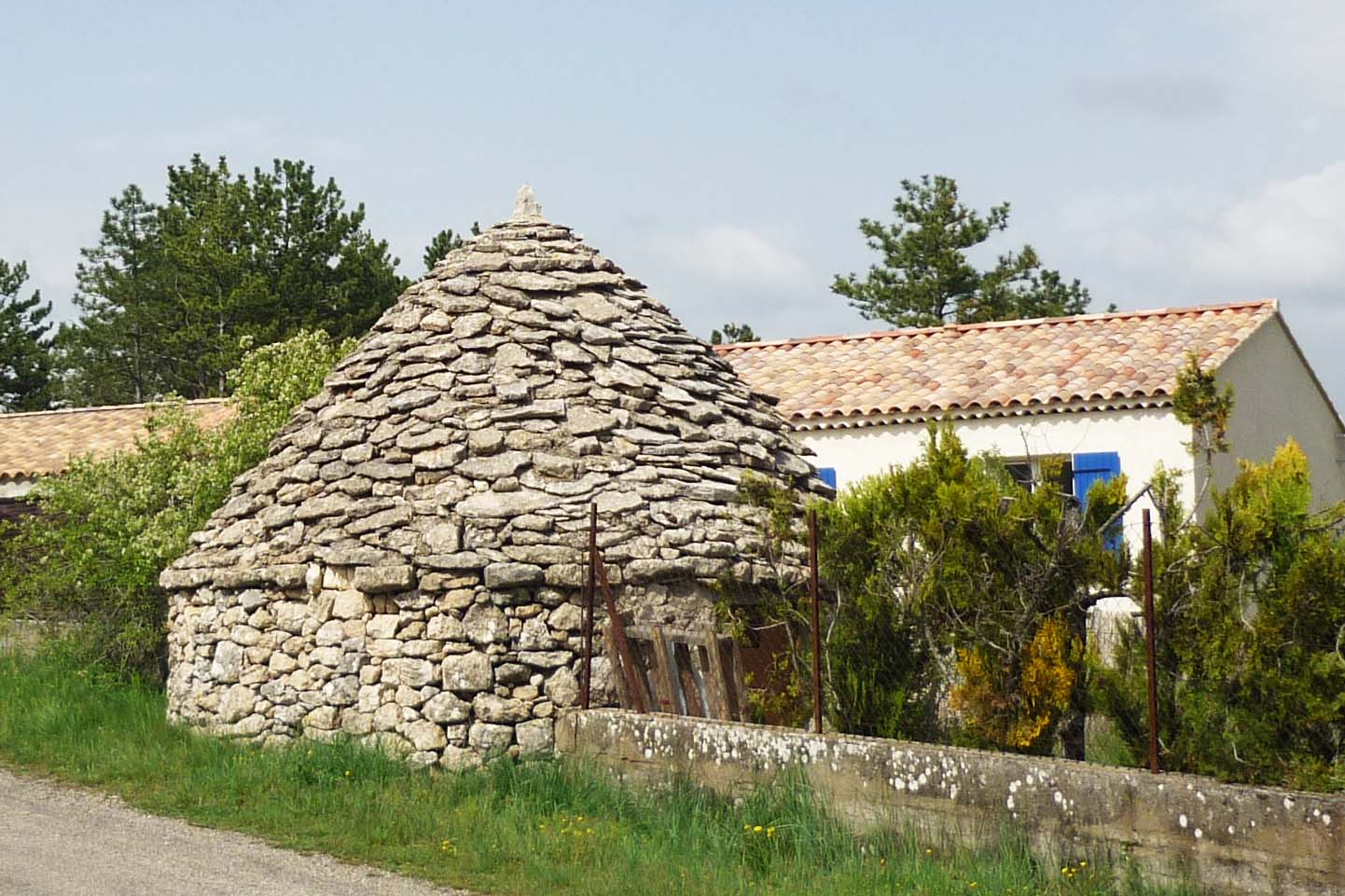
A conical dry-stone roof on a Trullo hut, Apulia, Italy

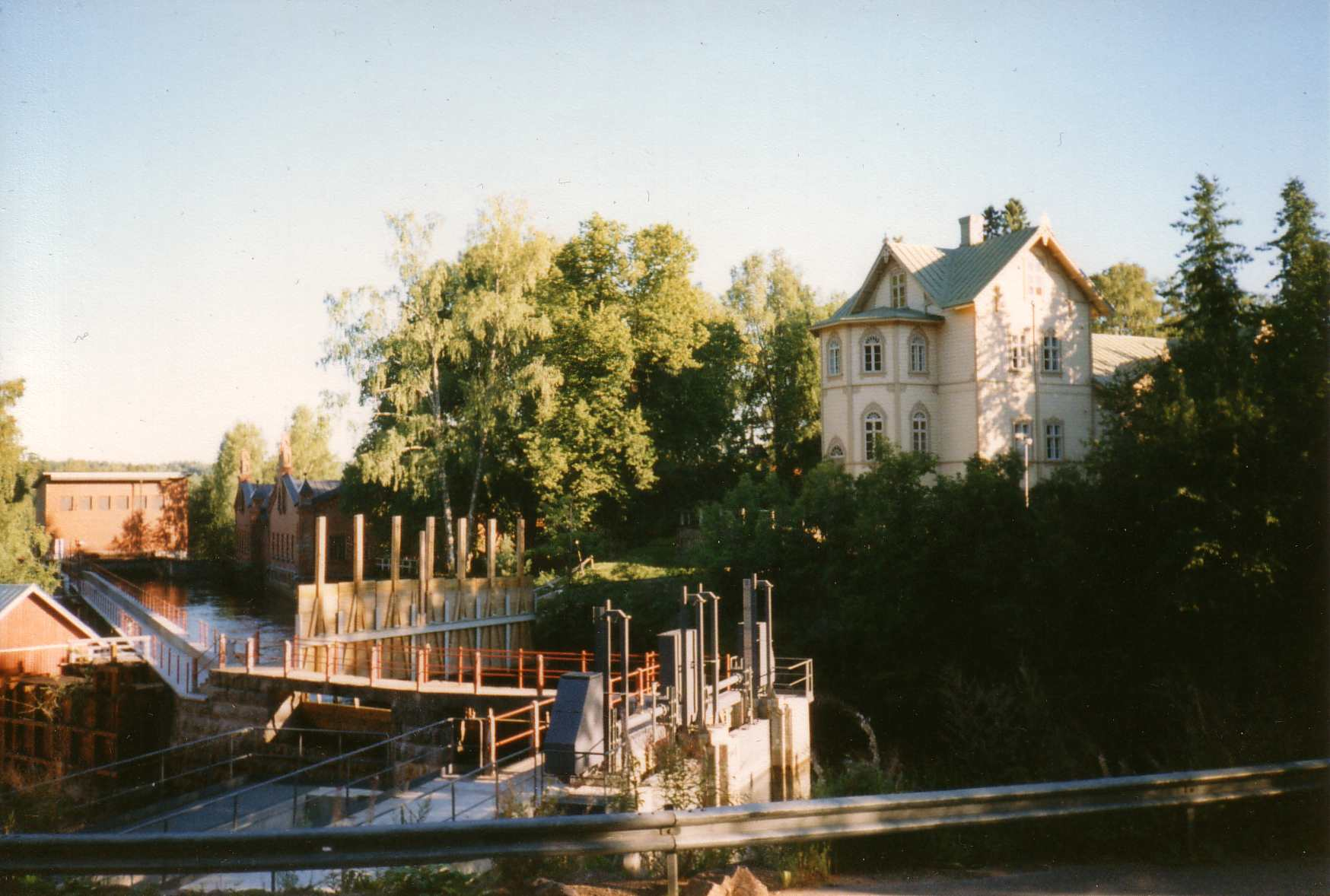
Cross gabled roof at the Verla mill village and a UNESCO World Heritage Site in Kouvola

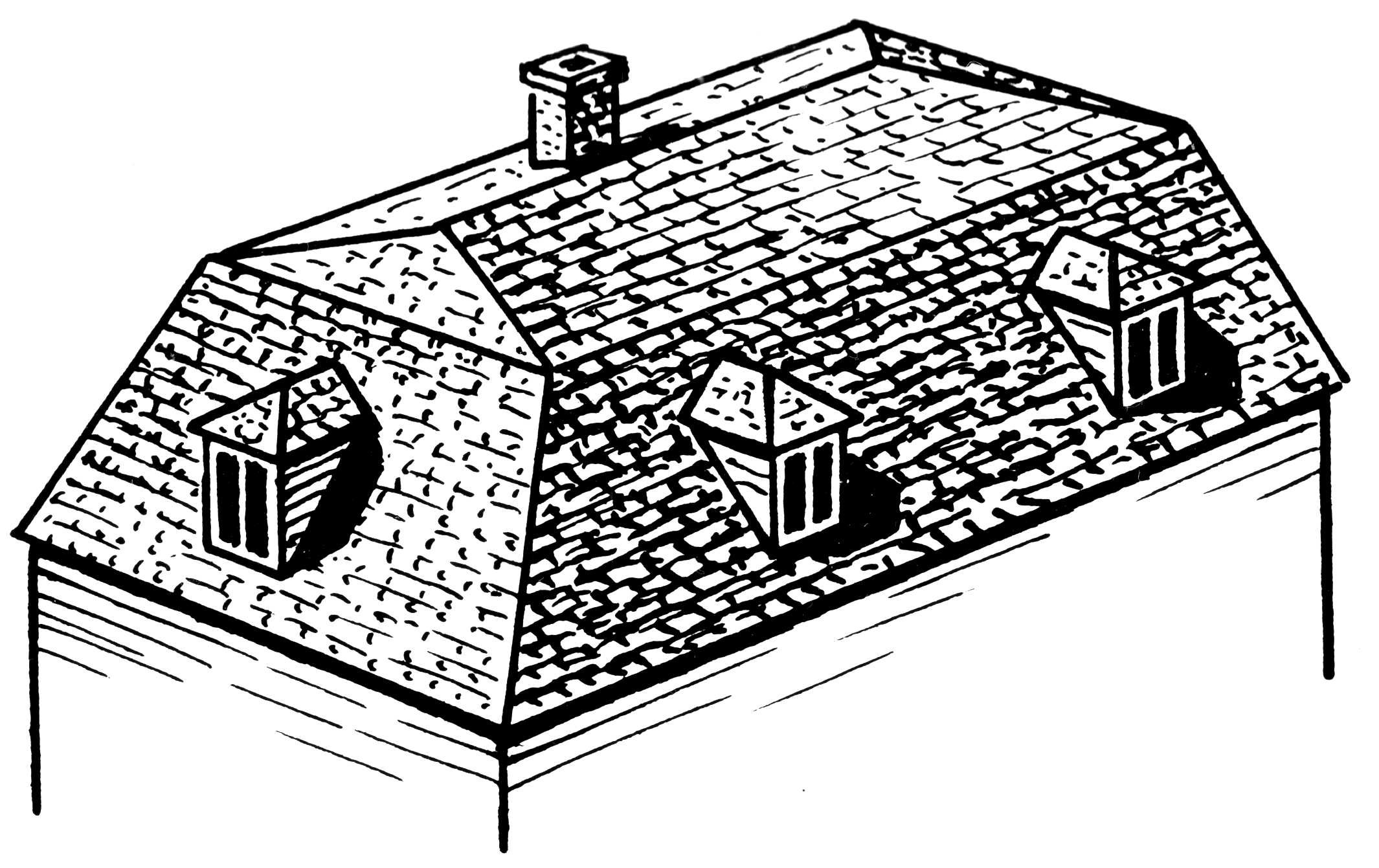
Basic mansard roof with dormer windows

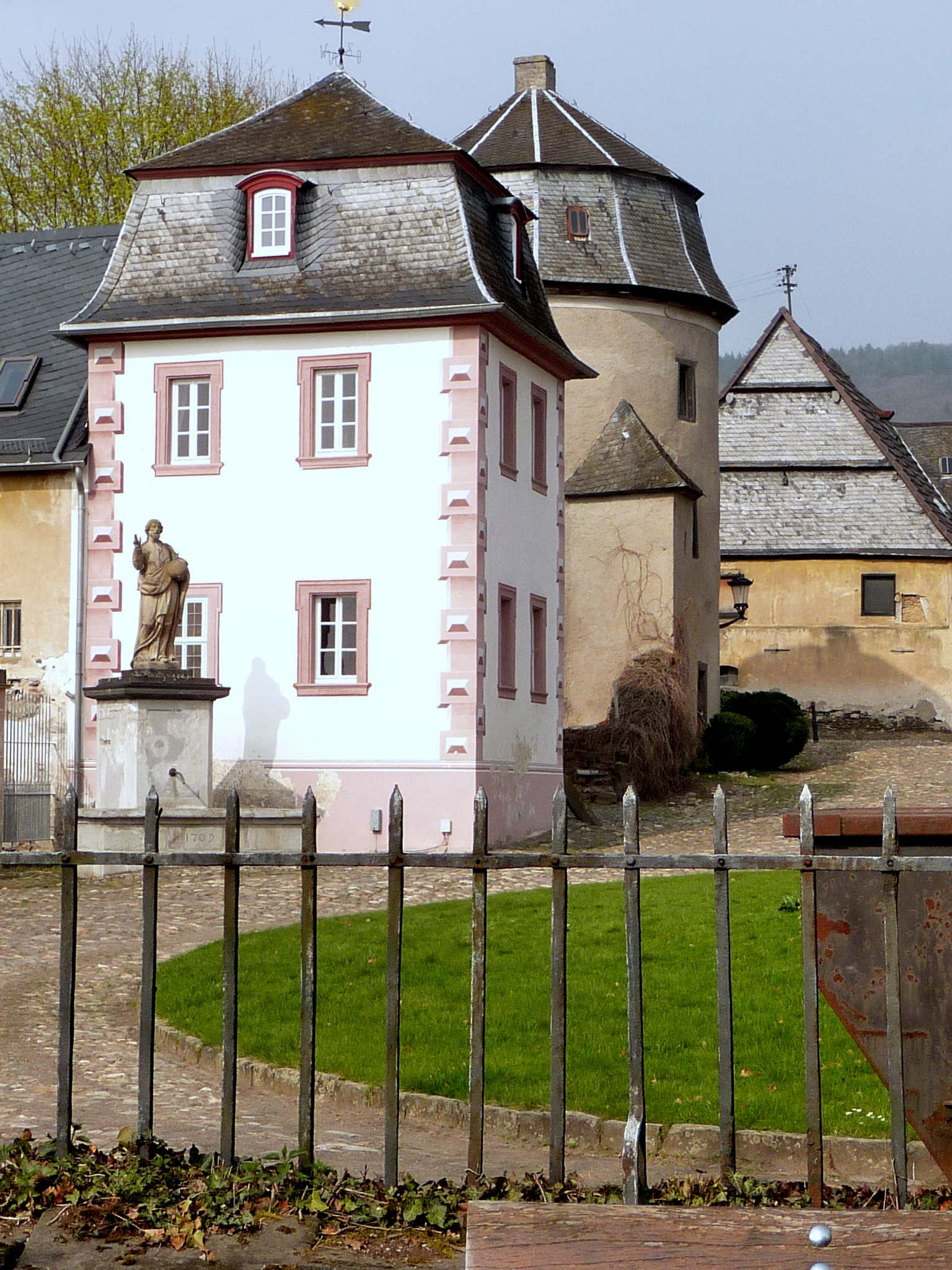
Curved form of a mansard roof with bell-cast eaves, Rommersdorf Abbey, Rheinland-Pfalz, Germany

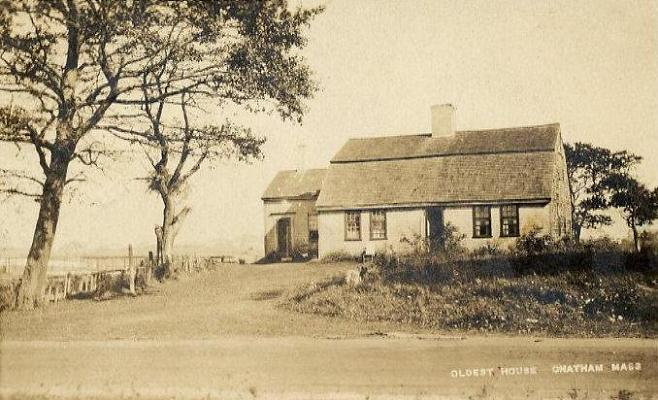
A common form of gambrel roof, Captain Joseph Atwood house, 1752; now part of the Atwood House Museum, Chatham, Massachusetts, US

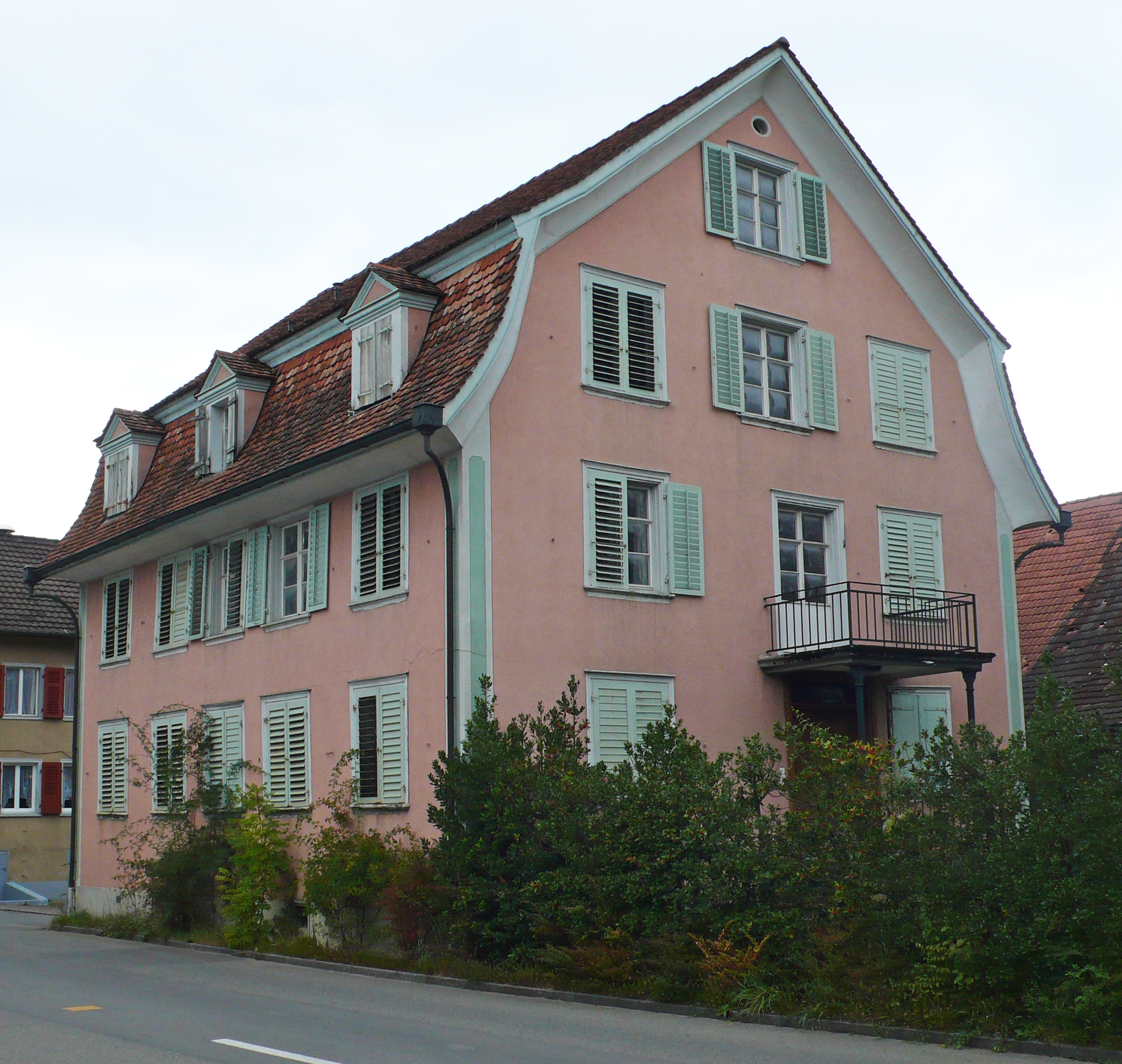
A less common form of gambrel roof with a curved lower roof slope with supporting curved soffits and thick tiles, Altnau, Switzerland

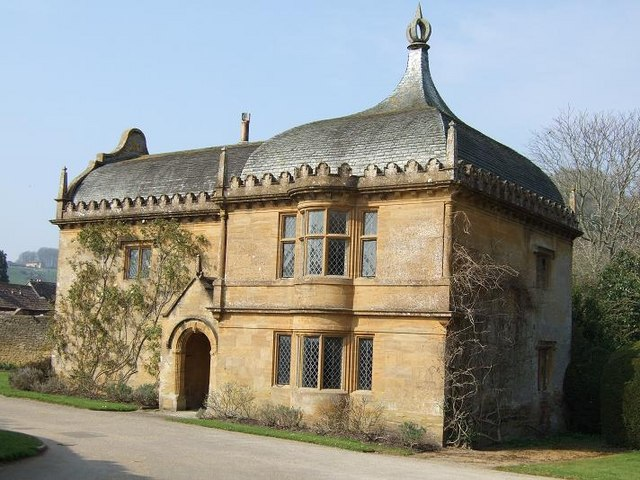
An ogee-curved roof, in both axes, Montacute Lodge, England

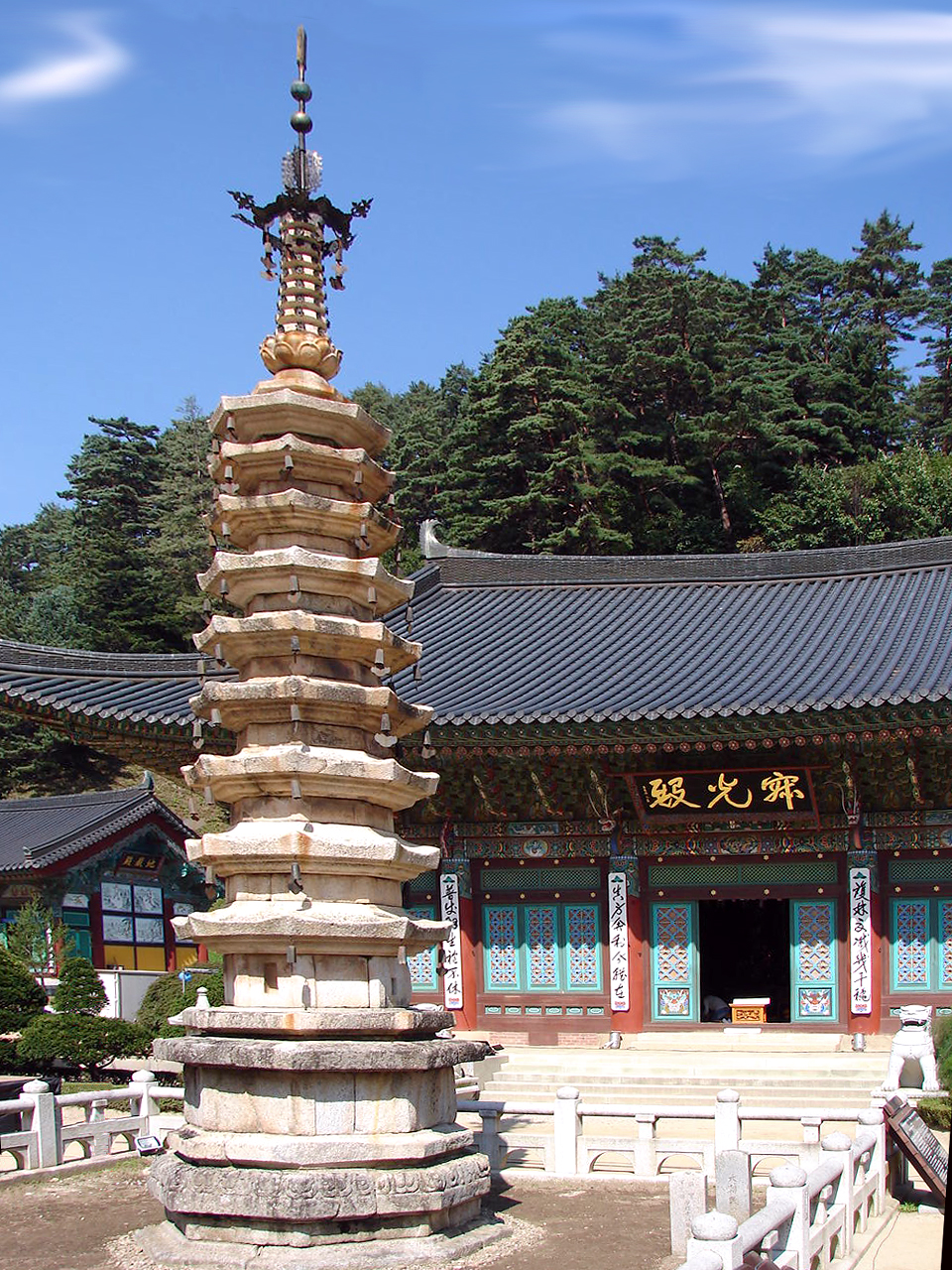
South Korean Woljeongsa Octagonal Nine Story Pagoda

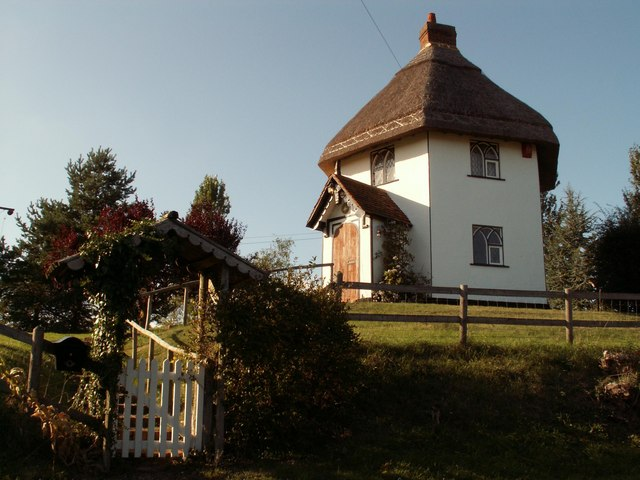
A pyramid roof with a chimney exiting the peak, The Round House, Finchingfield, Essex, England

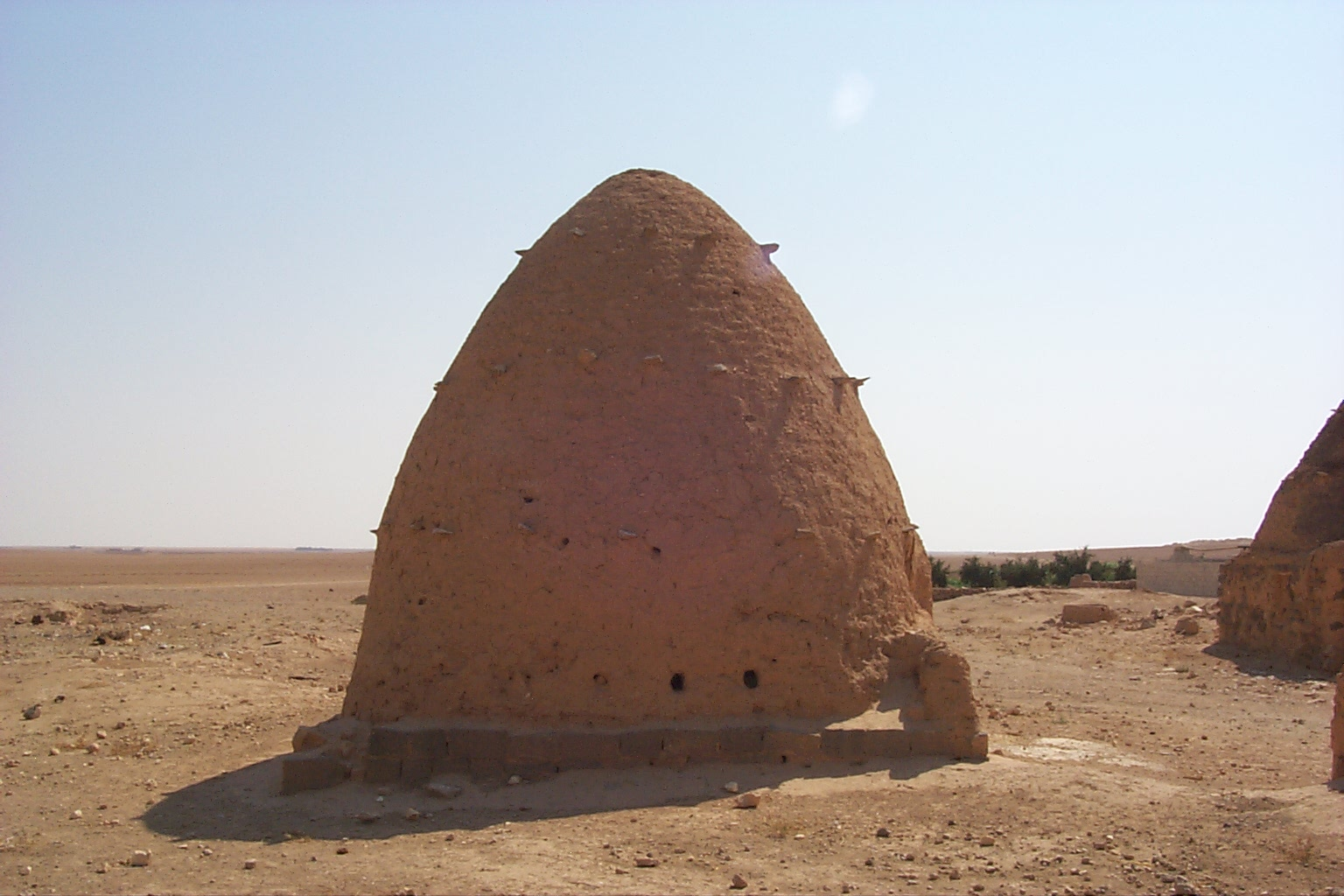
Beehive roof, a traditional Syrian form

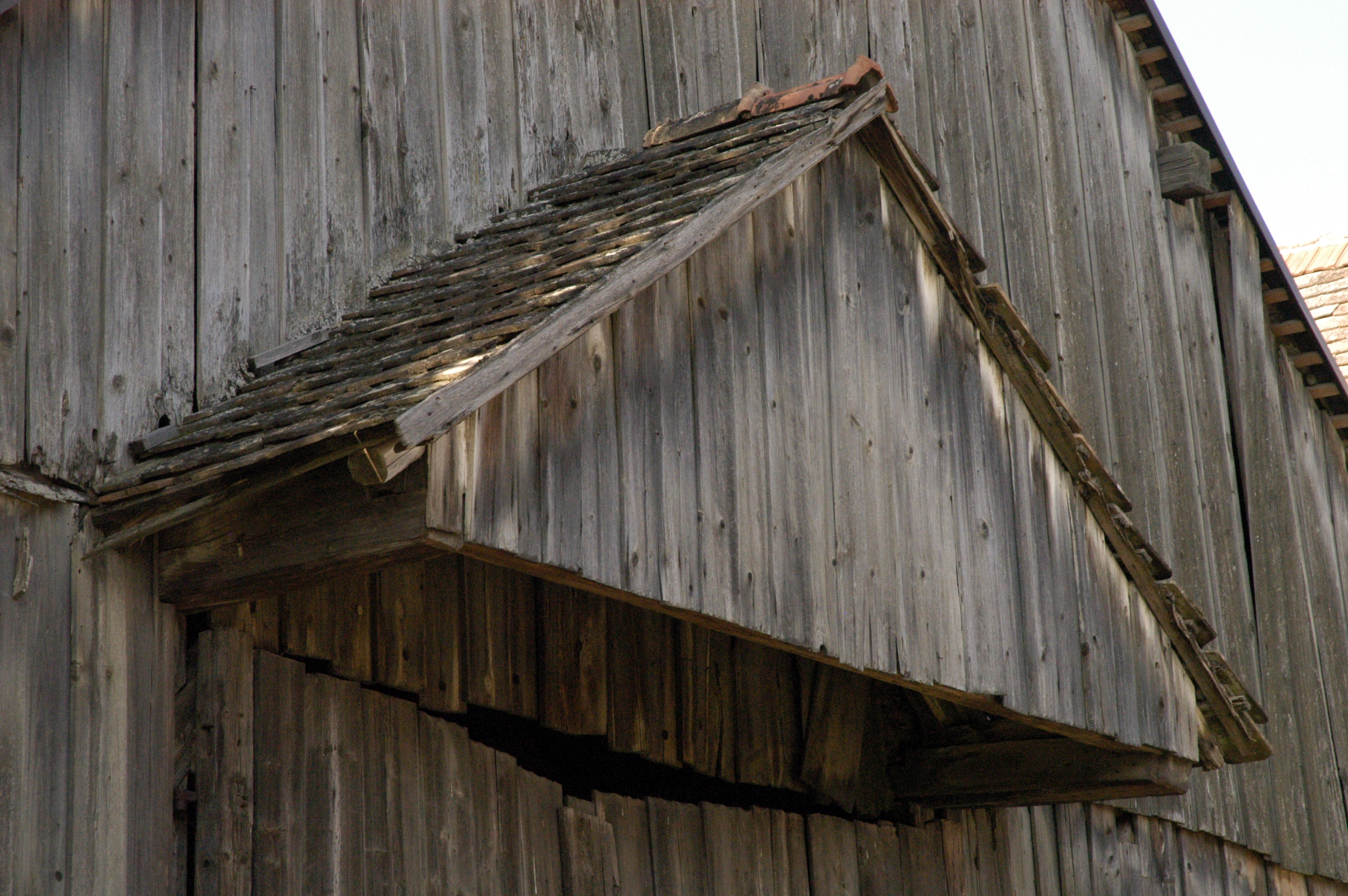
A pent roof is a lower roof attached to a wall

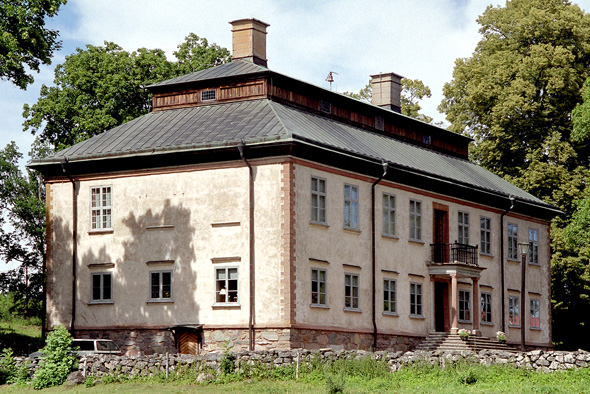
A Swedish Sateri is hipped and pent-hipped with two layers of eaves

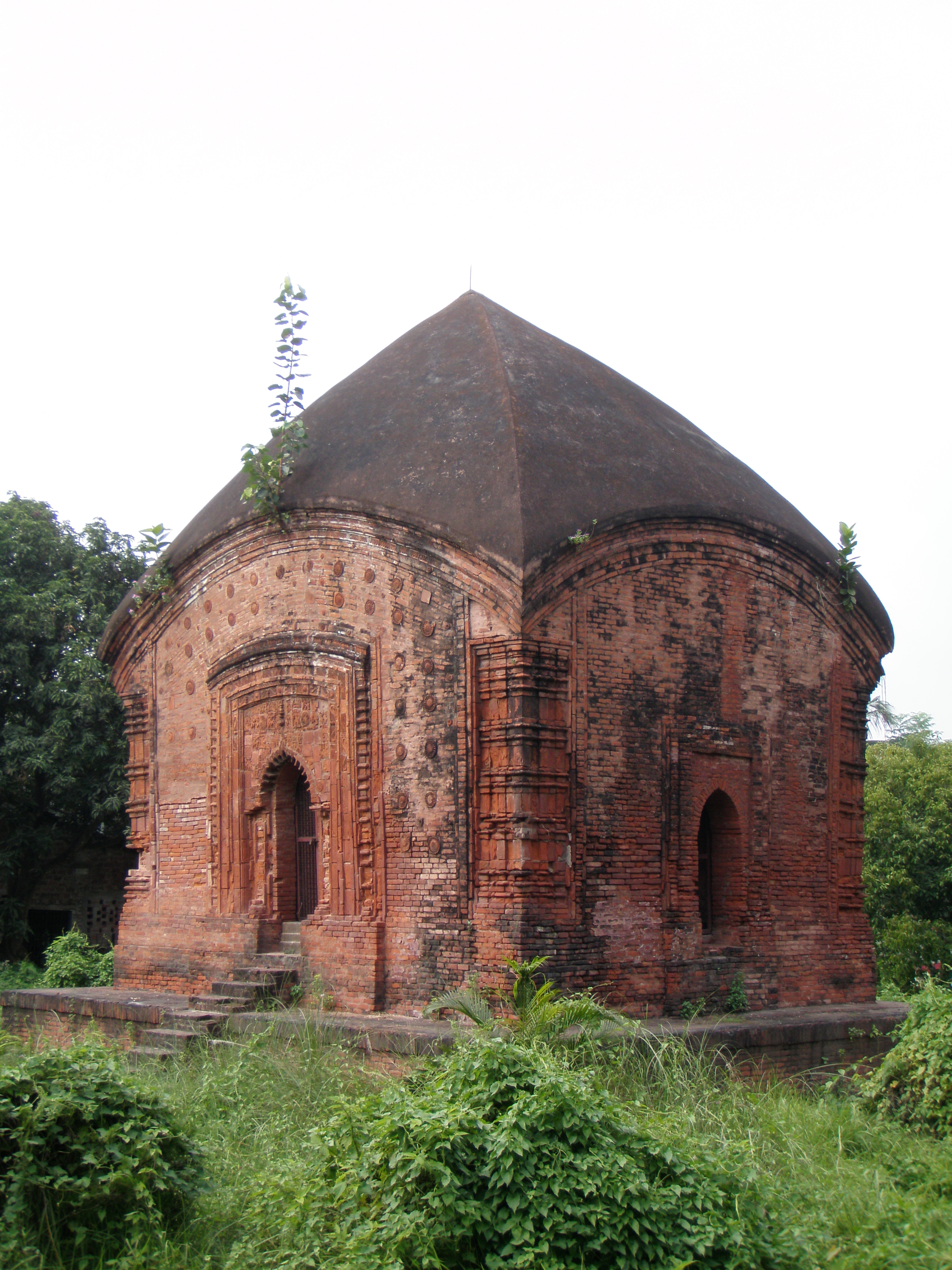
Rounded pyramidal roof on a charchala style temple in India

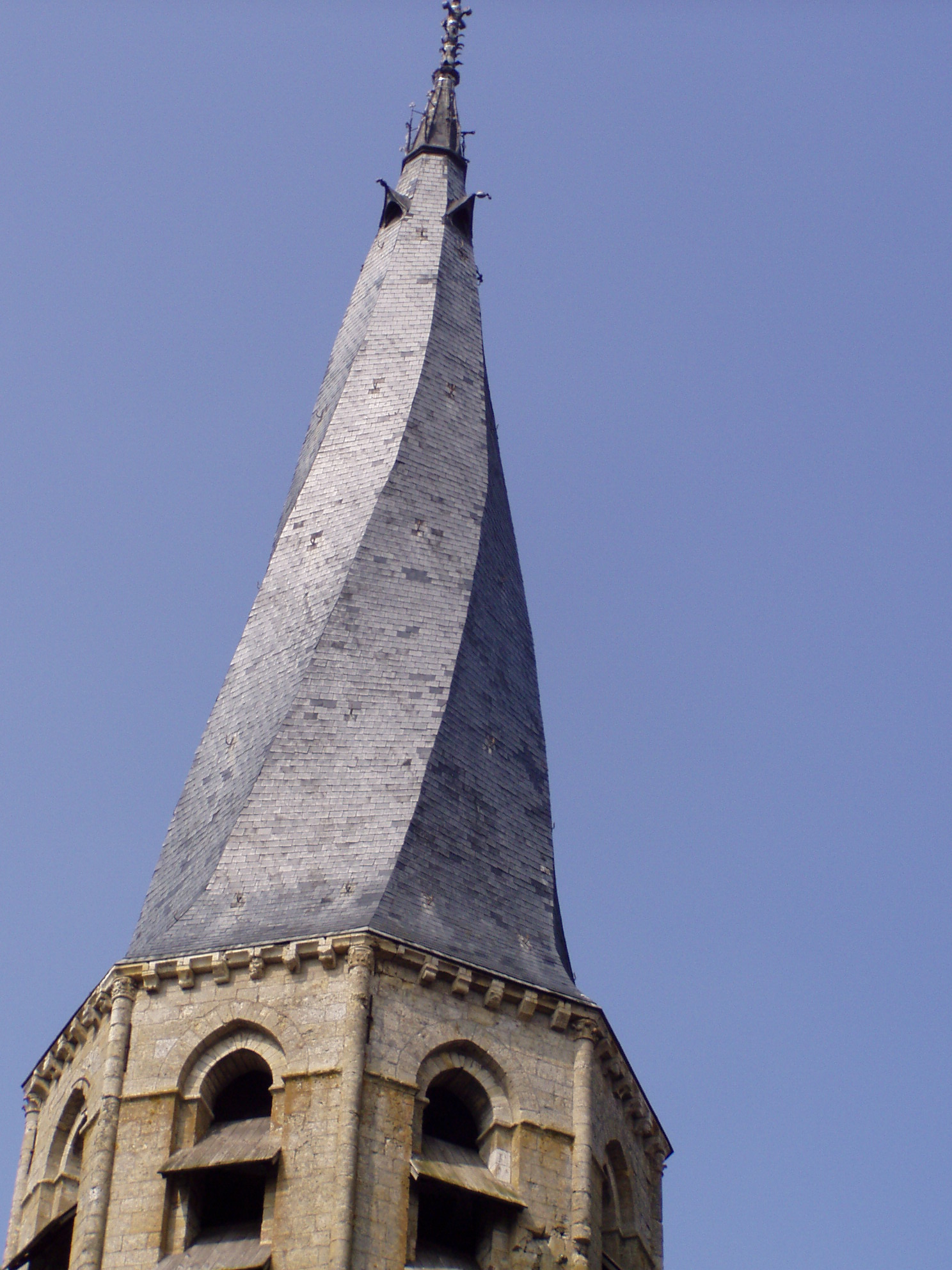
A spiraled church tower roof, cloister, Loiret, France

The Giwa roof of Dosan Seowon, Andong, South Korea

== See also ==
- Building construction
- Building envelope
- Building insulation
- Green roof: A roof with plantings to be more environmentally friendly, may be any form.
- List of commercially available roofing material
- Roof
- Stupa
