= Nakazonae =

Japanese architectural feature

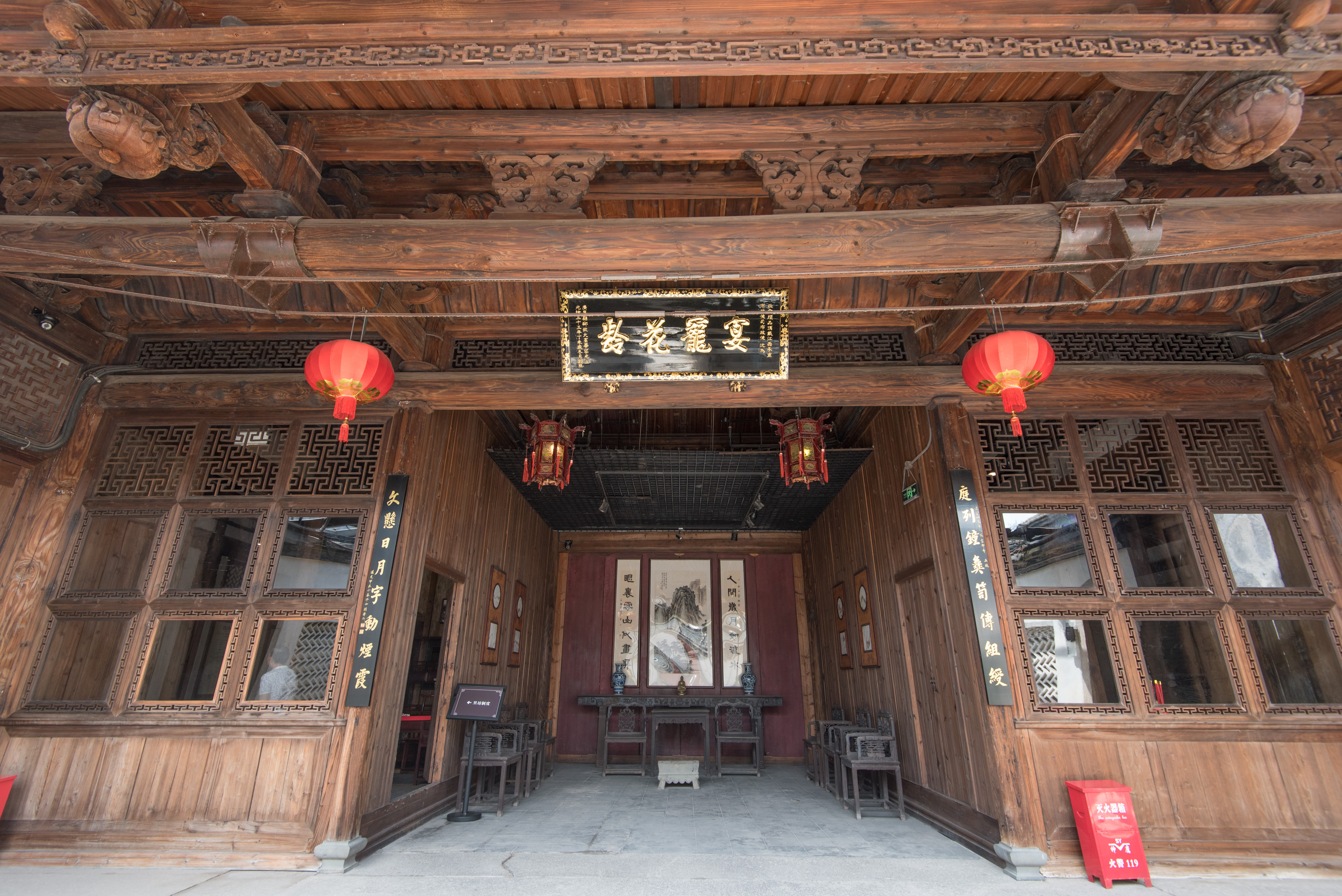
Tuofeng in Chinese architecture

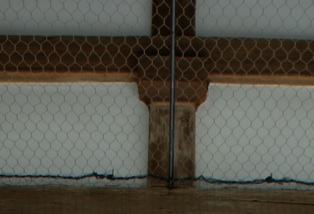
The shuzhu used as a dougong in China from Han dynasty and Tang dynasty is a kind of pillar which is currently used only as a non-dougong internal structure, is not a type of tuofeng. But it, known as kentozuka in Japan, is still used till now, and classified as a kind of nakazonae.

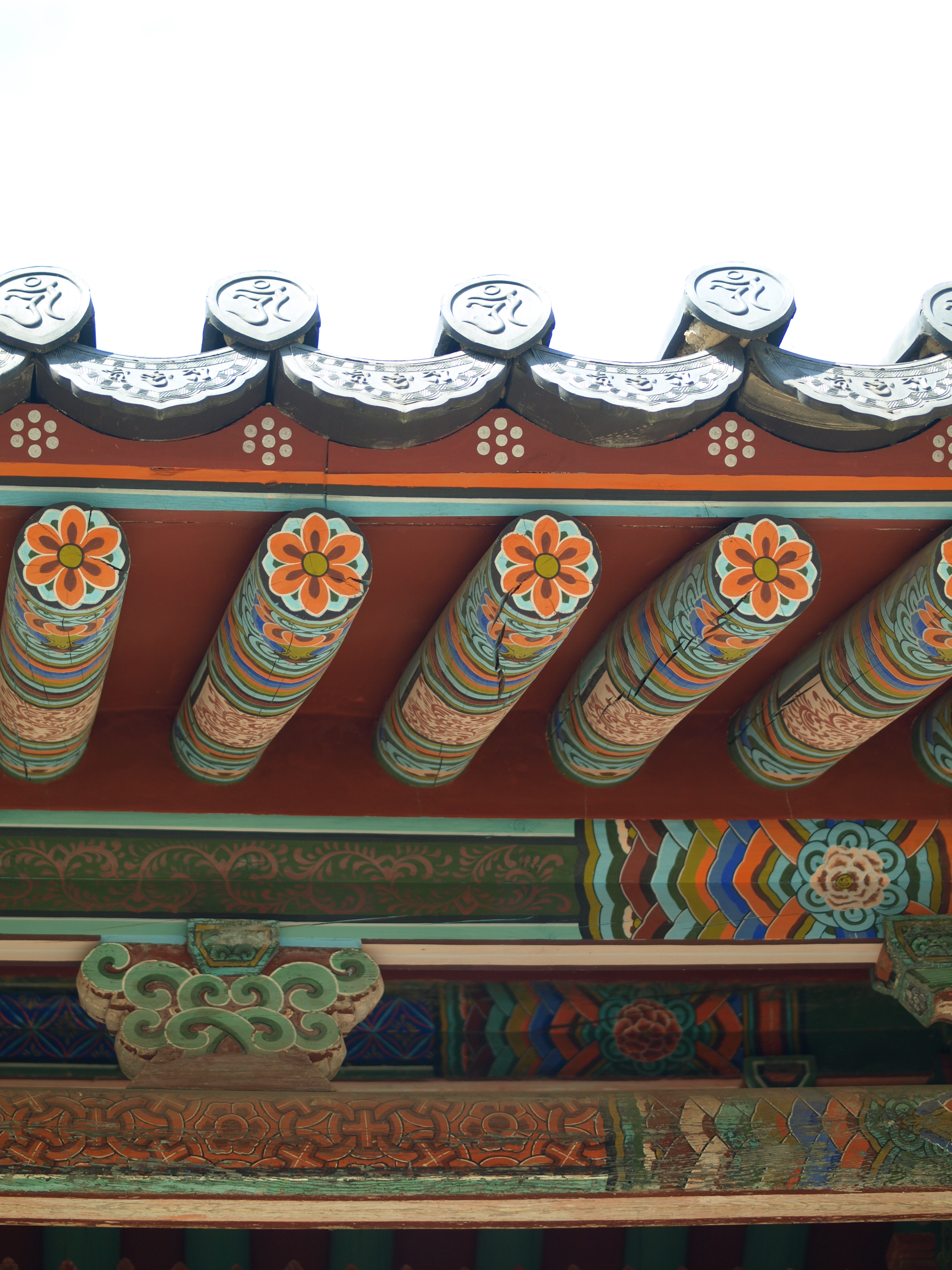
In Korean architecture

Nakazonae (中備・中具) is a Japanese classification of several intercolumnar struts of different origin installed in the intervals between bracket complexes (斗拱 tokyō) at wooden architectures in East Asia.

In origin they were necessary to help support the roof; however, at the end of the 10th century the invention of the hidden roof (Note: The hidden roof (noyane (野屋根)) is a structure, composed of a true roof with a second roof beneath, which permits to obtain a heavily slanted roof with arbitrarily shallow eaves. Having its own, hidden roof support system, it made the nakazonae largely redundant.) made them superfluous. They remained in use, albeit in a purely decorative role, and are typical of the Wayō style. The Zenshūyō style used by Zen temples has instead bracket complexes even between posts.

== Shuzhu or Kentozuka ==
The simplest of these struts are the kentozuka (間斗束; lit. 'interval block strut'; see photo above) composed of a short post and a bearing block.

=== Minozuka ===
Similar to the kentozuka is the fan-shaped strut called minozuka (蓑束; lit. straw raincoat strut) (see gallery), which can have decorations on the two sides called oigata (笈形) or a collar-like decoration between post and bearing block. The name comes from its shape, similar to that of a traditional straw raincoat called mino.

== Hana-hijiki ==
A variant of the hijiki (肘木) or timu (替木) is the hana-hijiki (花肘木), composed by either one or two horizontal series bearing blocks standing over an elaborately carved floral pattern.

== Renzigong or Warizuka ==
The 人-shaped dougong (Chinese: 人字栱) warizuka (割束) strut consists of a wooden inverted V topped by a bearing block.

== Kaerumata or Tuofeng ==
The kaerumata (蛙股・蟇股; lit. frog legs) or tuofeng (駝峰) was named after its shape, resembling a frog's splayed legs.

Its origins are not known with certainty, but it may be an evolution of the warizuka. Invented during the 12th century, it became gradually more and more elaborate, to the point where in the Edo period the strut itself would be hidden behind the decorations.

Two basic types exist. In the case of the sukashi-kaerumata (透蟇股), the space above and between the frog legs is either empty or carved. In the case of the ita-kaerumata (板蟇股), the space between the legs has completely disappeared, leaving behind a solid board with an external frog-leg profile.

== Types of nakazonae ==
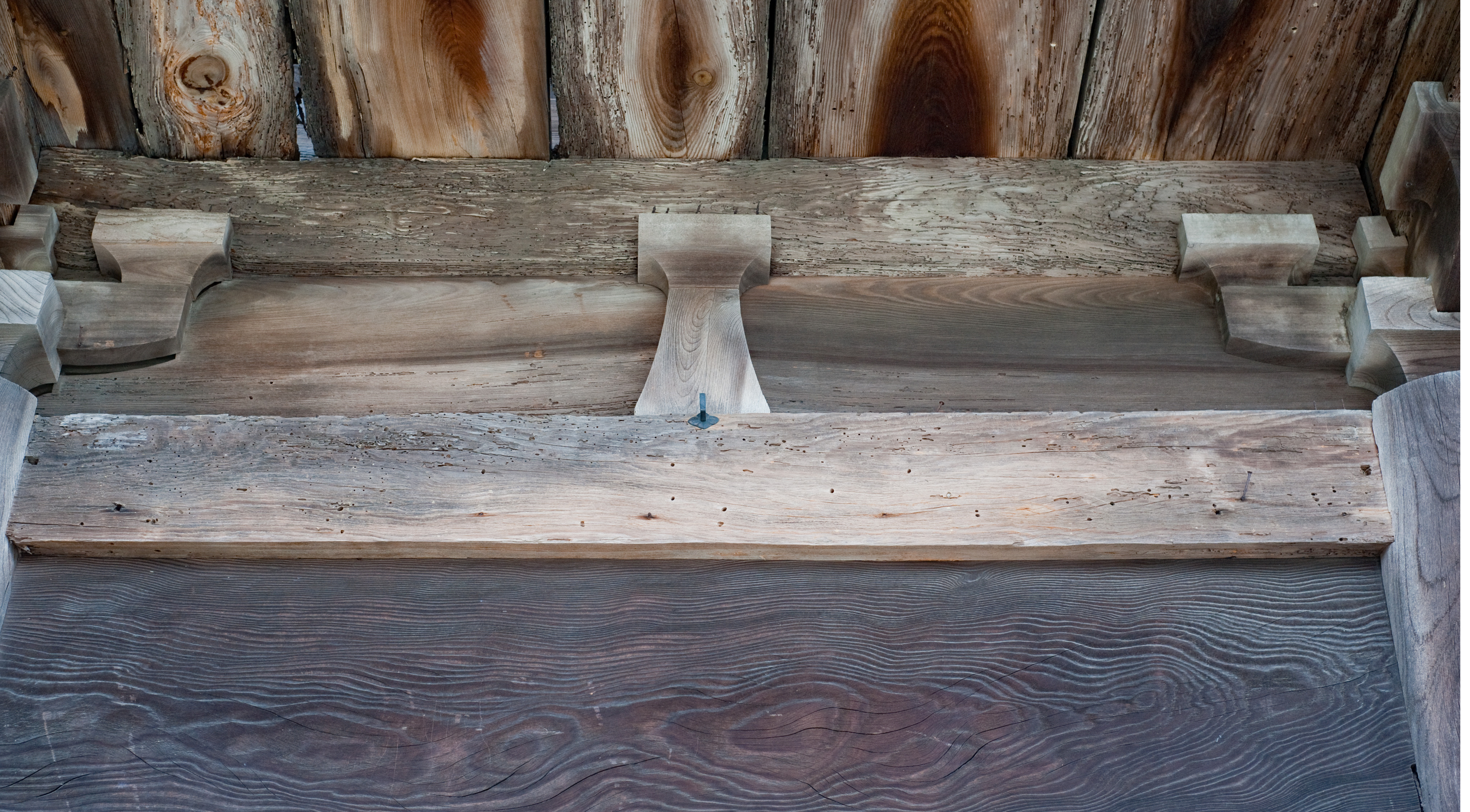
Minozuka (Rōmon, Hongaku-ji, Kamakura)

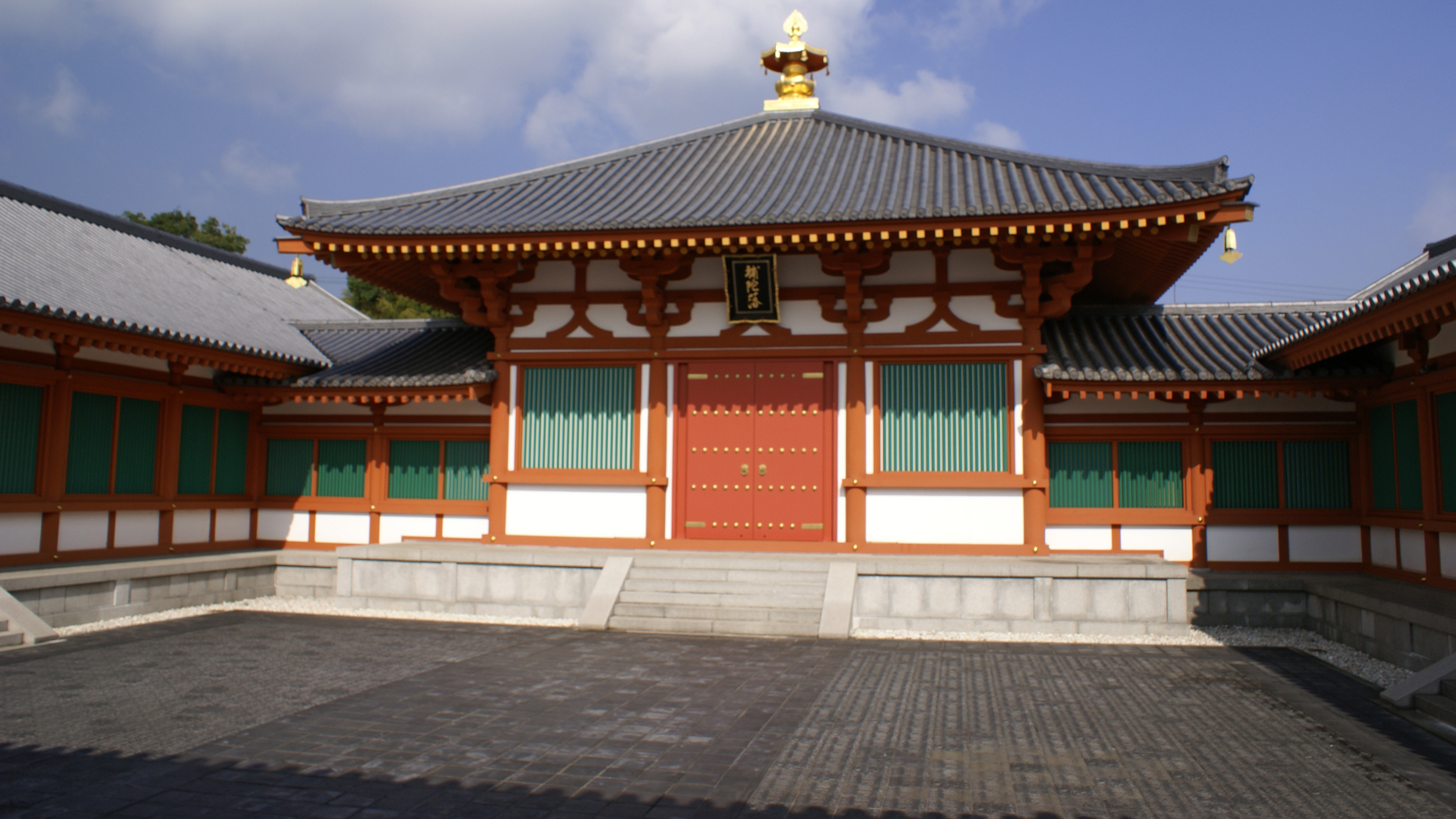
Warizuka (sides) and tokyō (center) (Hōryū-ji)

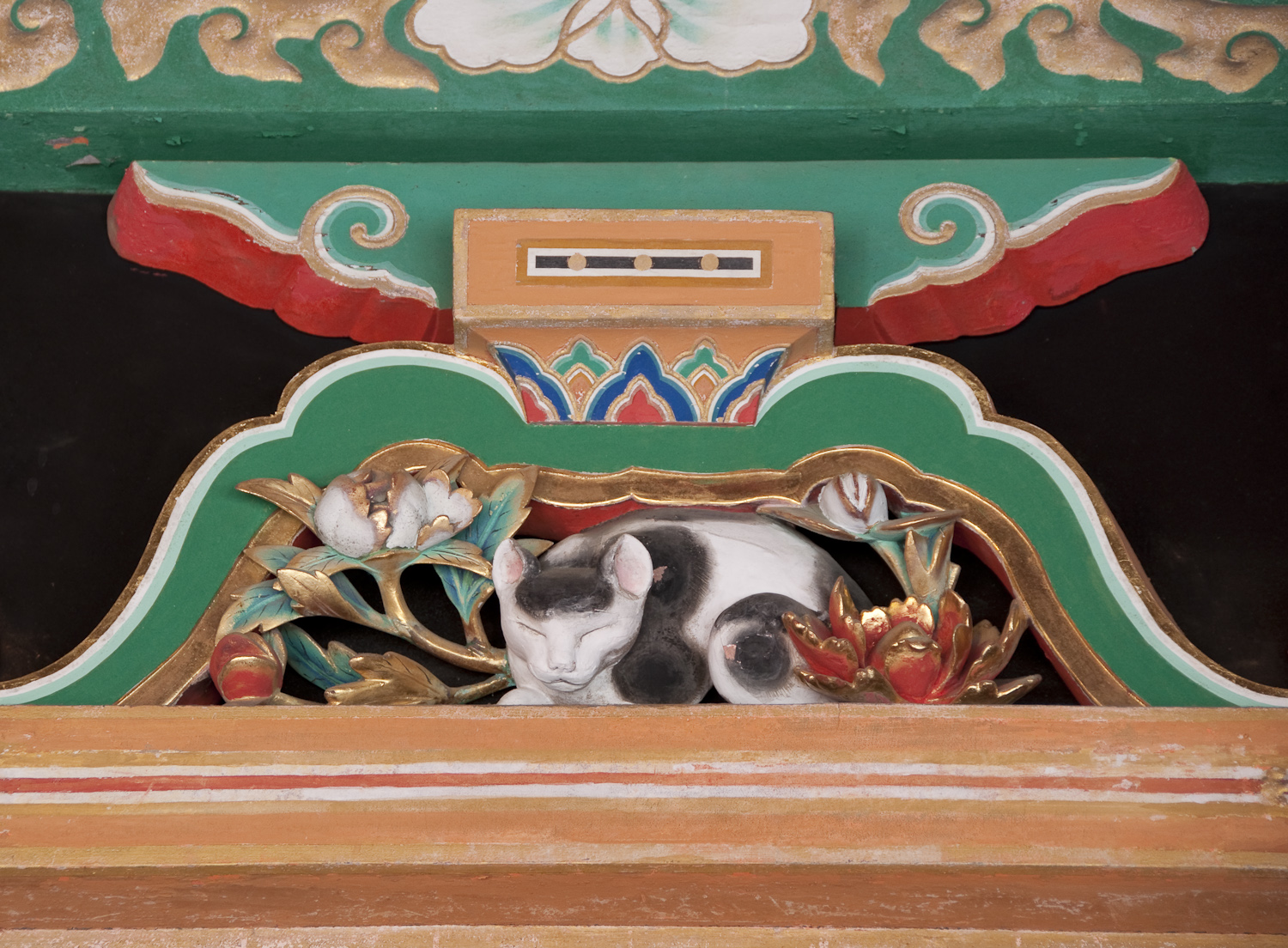
Sukashi-kaerumata (Kitano Tenman-gū)

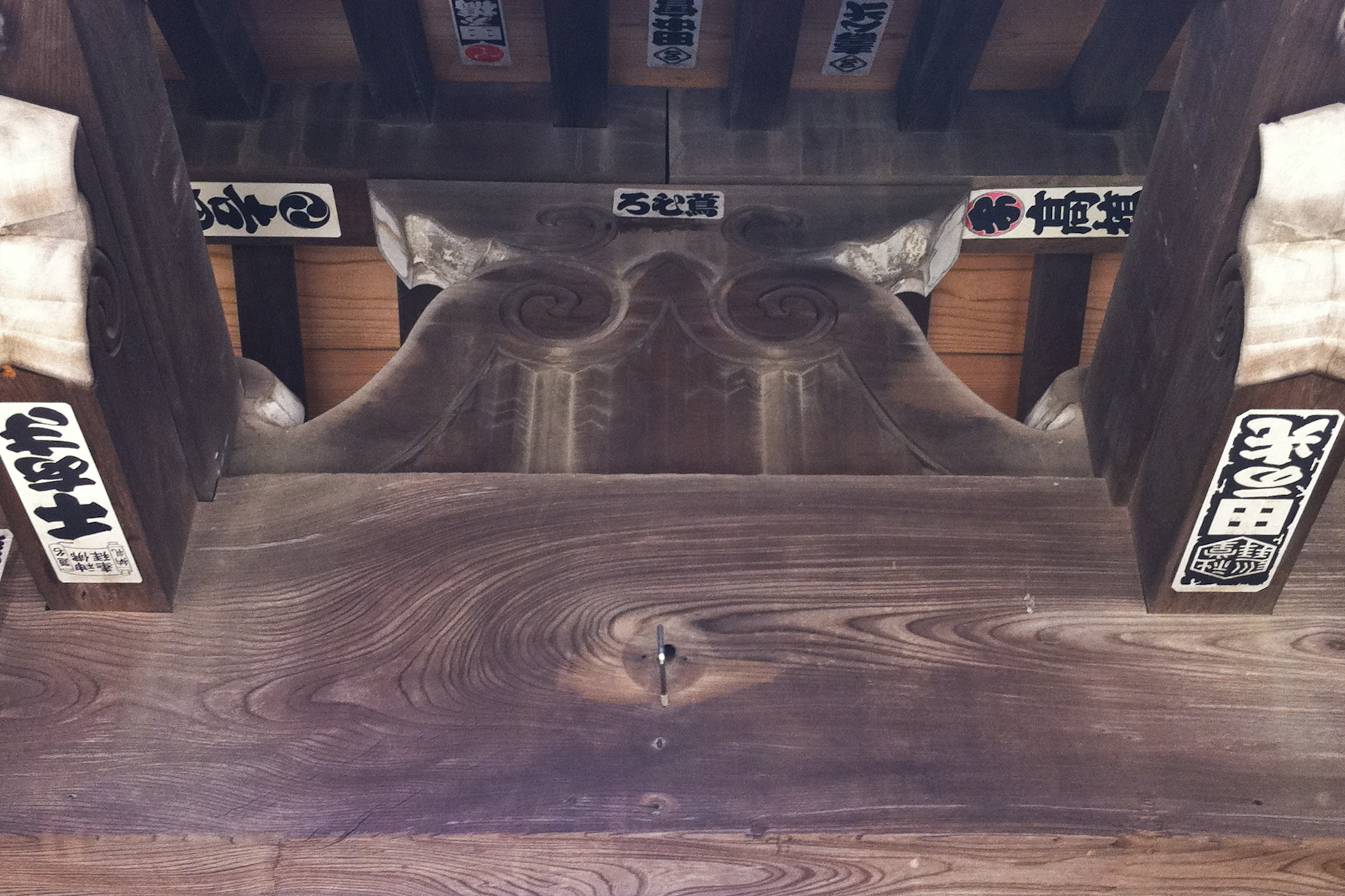
Ita-kaerumata, Yonkyaku-mon, Hongaku-ji, Kamakura

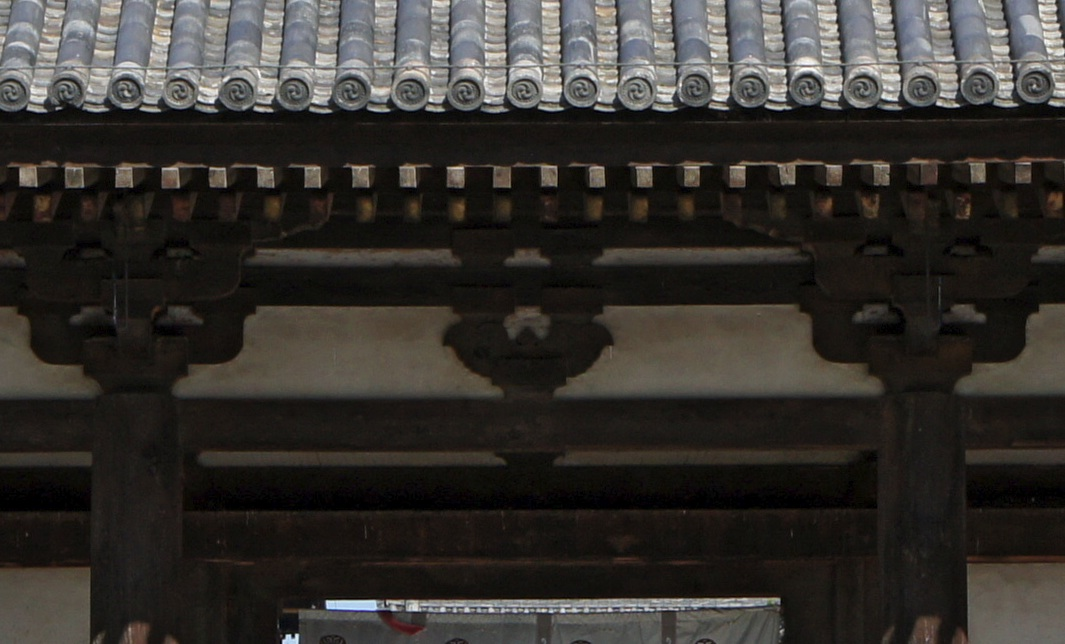
Hana-hijiki, center, between two tokyō (Hōryū-ji, Nandaimon)
