= Barrel roof =

Type of curved roof

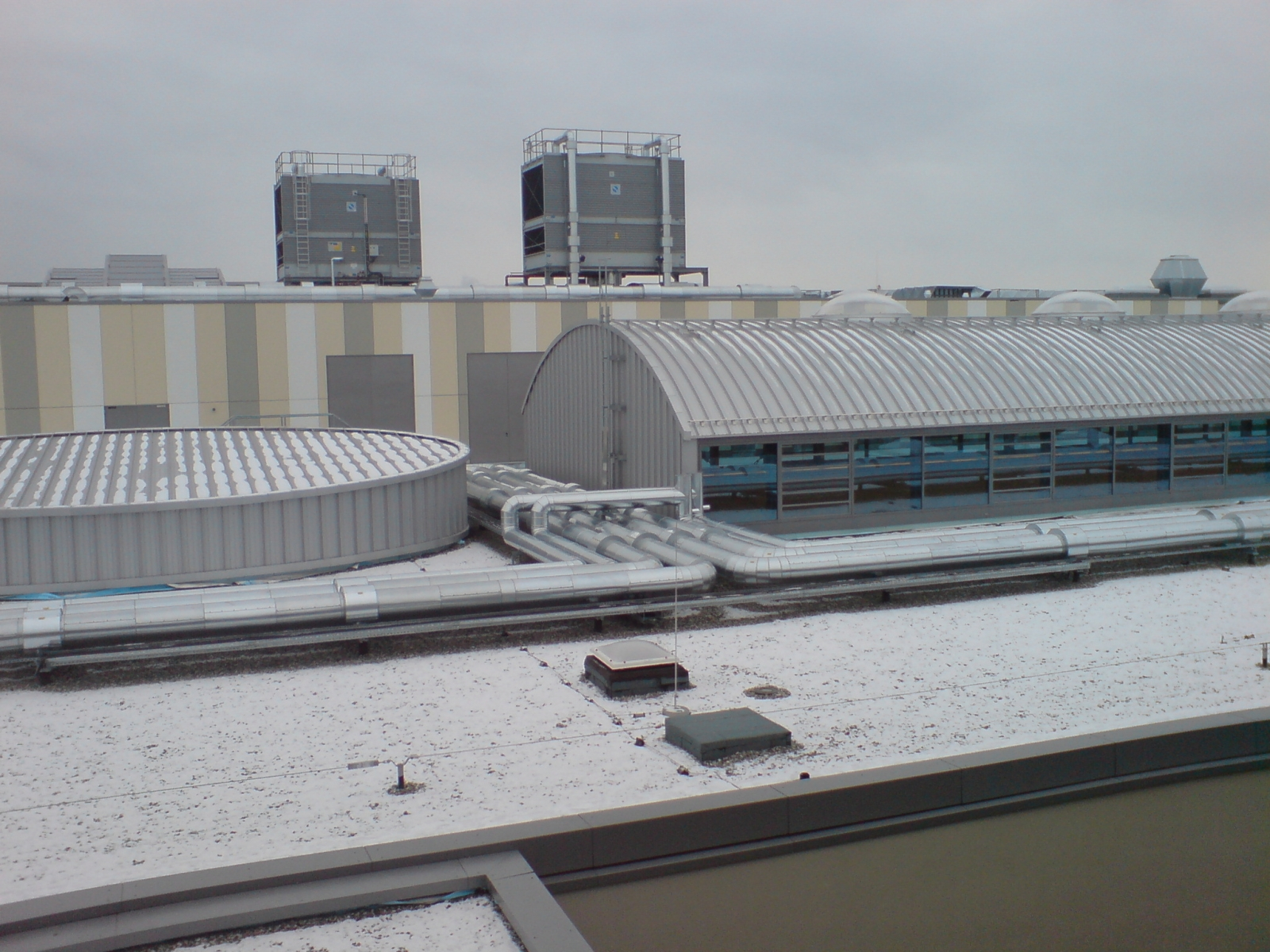
A barrel roof on the skylights of the Loop5 shopping mall in Darmstadt, Germany.

A barrel roof is a curved roof that, especially from below, is curved like a cut-away barrel. They have some advantages over dome roofs, especially being able to cover rectangular buildings, due to their uniform cross-section.

Barrel vaults are a particular form of barrel roof.

Two examples of a barrel roof

== See also ==
- List of roof shapes
