= Hidden roof =

Type of roof

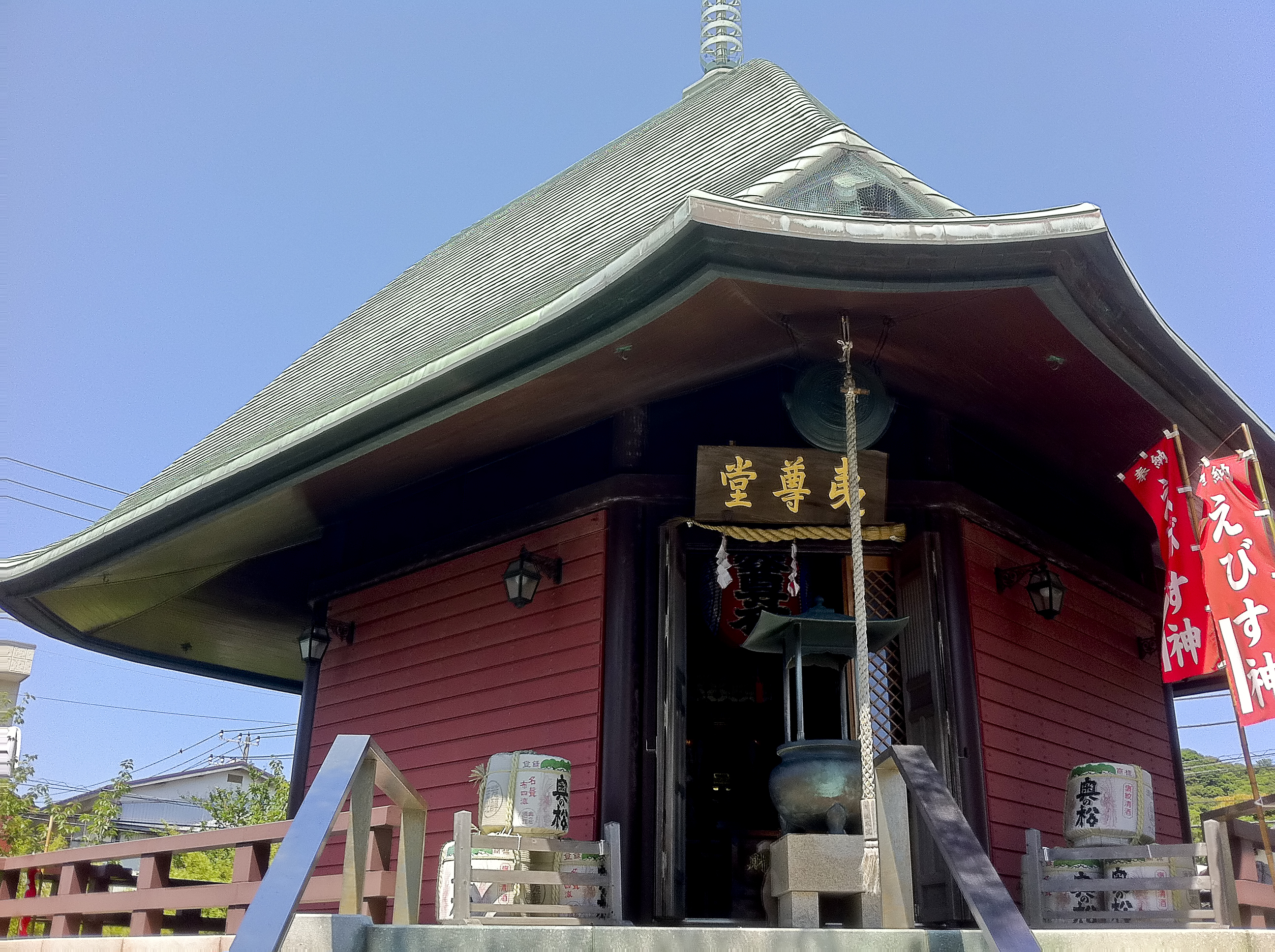
A hidden roof: an extremely slanted roof with practically horizontal eaves (Ebisu-dō, Honkaku-ji, Kamakura)

The hidden roof (野屋根, noyane) (Note: Also sometimes called nokoya (野小屋; literally "hidden small house"). Koya is the technical term for the space between the roof and the ceiling.) is a type of roof widely used in Japan both at Buddhist temples and Shinto shrines. It is composed of a true roof above and a second roof beneath, permitting an outer roof of steep pitch to have eaves of shallow pitch, jutting widely from the walls but without overhanging them. The second roof is visible only from under the eaves and is therefore called a "hidden roof" (giving its name to the whole structure) while the first roof is externally visible and is called an "exposed roof" in English and "cosmetic roof" (化粧屋根, keshōyane) in Japanese. Invented in Japan during the 10th century, its earliest extant example is Hōryū-ji's Daikō-dō, rebuilt after a fire in 990.

== History and structure ==
Section of a temple's roof showing the inner structure of a hidden roof

Japanese architecture continued to evolve after new techniques imported from China and Korea together with Buddhism around the 6th century. Climate in Japan being different from that on the continent, several structural adaptations became necessary, the most important of which is the noyane, invented some time during the Heian period (794–1185).

During the previous Nara period (710–794), the structural elements of a roof were considered ornamental and therefore left exposed by design. The rafters supporting the roof's eaves would enter the building and would then be visible from below. Above the rafters would be laid directly on the roofing material, for example wood shingles. This is the structure of Hōryū-ji's kon-dō or five-storied pagoda. Because the local climate is moister than in either China or Korea, roofs had to have a steeper incline to help quicken the flow of rainwater. Due to the permeable nature of the walls, and the lack of channelled roof drainage, it was necessary that eaves project far from the walls. On a roof of steep pitch, the wide eaves were also deep, restricting light to the windows and trapping humidity.

The solution devised by Japanese artisans was to construct a hidden roof raised above a ceiling which had non-structural rafters as aesthetic elements. From the hidden roof projected the principal rafters of the shallow-pitched eaves. The structural elements of the outer roof were raised above this, with an outer inclination completely independent of the pitch of the eaves. The earliest extant example of hidden roof is Hōryū-ji's Daikō-dō, built in 990 and was discovered only in the 1930s during repair work.

== Influence ==
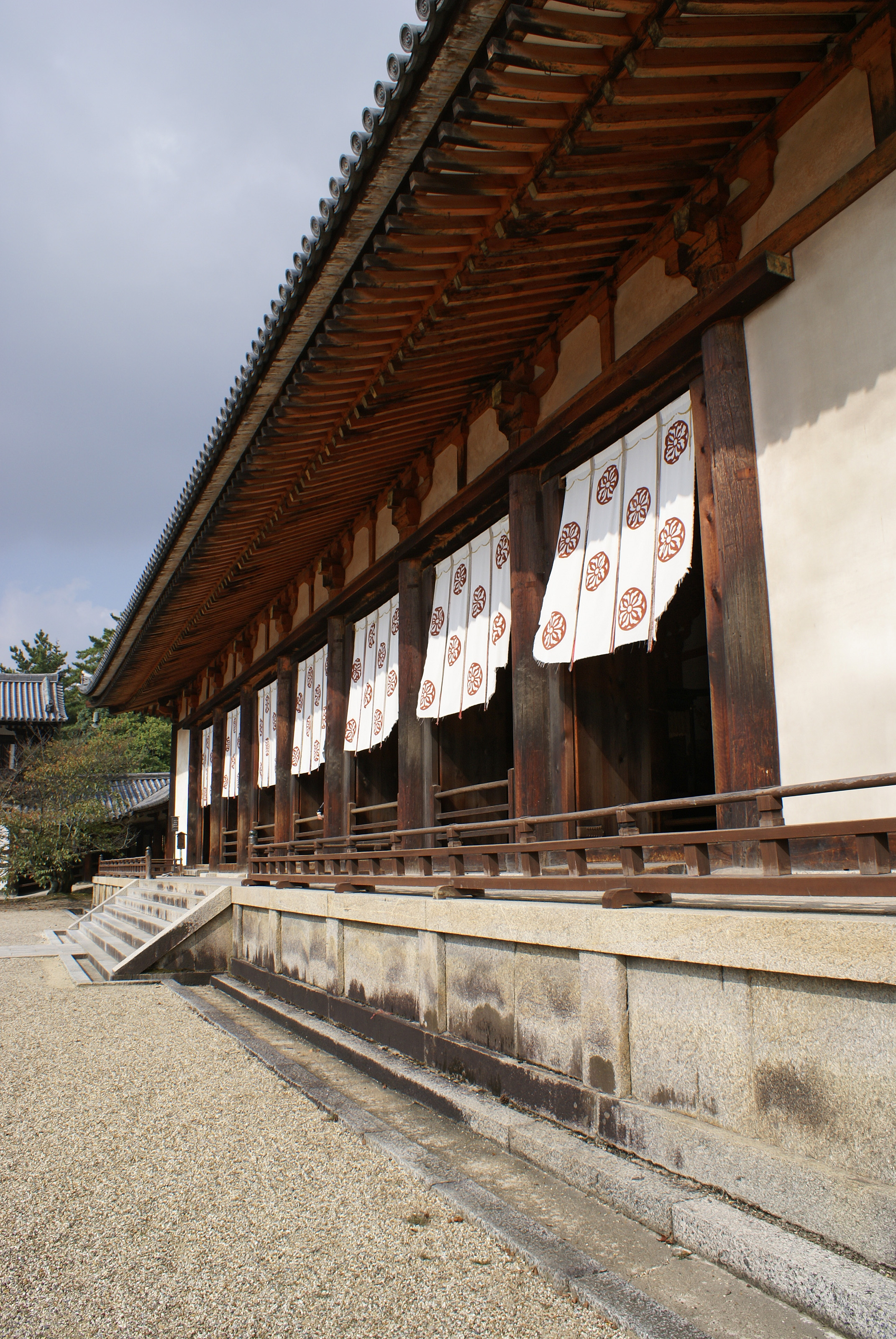
Hōryū-ji's Daikō-dō is the earliest extant example of noyane.

This structure not only solved drainage problems, but eliminated deep shadows and gave the whole temple a feel that was very different from that of its ancestors of the Asian continent. It was as a consequence extremely successful and was widely adopted all over the country. One important exception is the architectural style called Daibutsuyō which, although arrived in Japan from China at the end of the 12th century, thus well after the invention of the hidden roof, never adopted it. Also, although all extant Zen temples have it, it is likely that the Zenshūyō style, which arrived roughly at the same time of the Daibutsuyō, adopted the hidden roof only some time after its arrival.

Because the hidden roof allowed the structure of the roof to be changed at will with no impact on the underlying building, its use gave birth to many structural innovations. For example, Fuki-ji's Ō-dō has a square roof over a rectangular footprint. Ways were also found to make use of the space between the two roofs. For example, at Jōruri-ji in Kyōto (1107) part of the Hon-dō's ceiling was raised above the rest to give space to the room. Later, it would become common to raise the exposed roof above the entire core of a temple building.

The same evolution we have seen in Buddhist architecture can be seen in the roofs of several Shinto architectural styles it influenced. The kasuga-zukuri, nagare-zukuri, hachiman-zukuri, hie-zukuri all followed the evolution path we have seen. All extant examples of the ancient shinmei-zukuri, taisha-zukuri and sumiyoshi-zukuri styles however show no sign of a hidden roof.

=== Tsumakazari ===
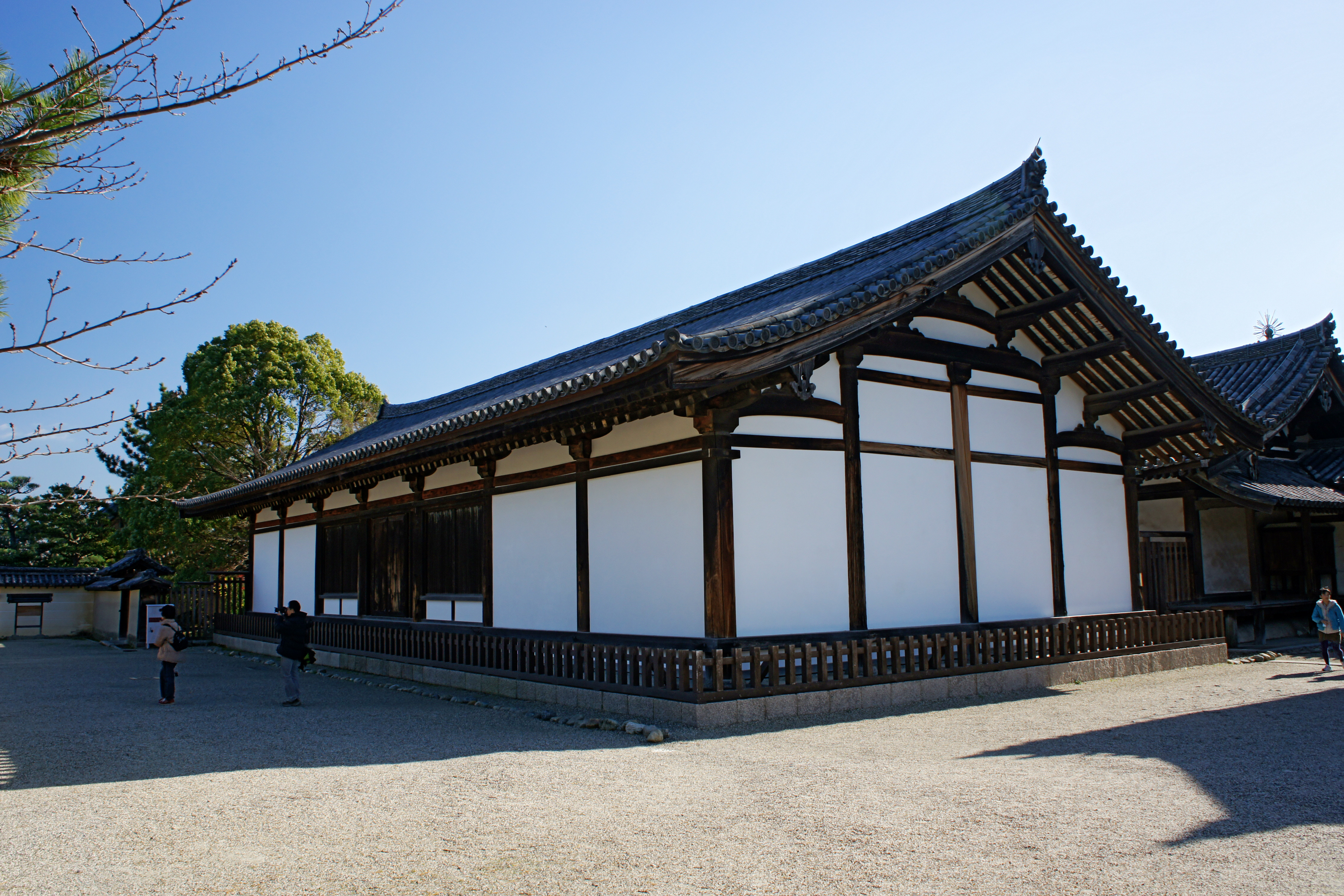
Hōryū-ji, Denpō-dō. The tsumakazari, all structural elements in this case are visible within the gable.

Before the invention of the hidden roof, the so-called tsumakazari (妻飾; lit. 'gable ornaments') were simply structural elements left visible by design. See for example Hōryū-ji's Denpō-dō in the photo to the right, where the brown elements within the gable are all part of the roof's support system. After the adoption of the hidden roof, the tsumakazari remained in use, albeit with a purely decorative role.

=== Nakazonae ===
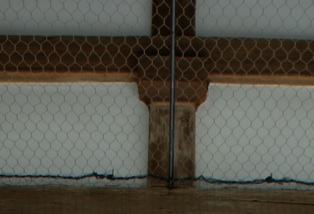
Kentozuka, Tōshōdai-ji

Another of the repercussions of the invention of the hidden roof was the role change undergone by struts, called nakazonae (中備・中具). Nakazonae are intercolumnar struts provided in the intervals between bracket complexes (tokyō) at religious buildings in Japan.

In origin they were necessary to support the roof above, however at the end of the 10th century the invention of the hidden roof, which had its own hidden supporting structure, made them superfluous. They remained in use, albeit in a purely decorative role, assuming a variety of forms, and are typical of the Wayō style.

== See also ==
- List of roof shapes
