= Dutch gable roof =

Type of roof shape

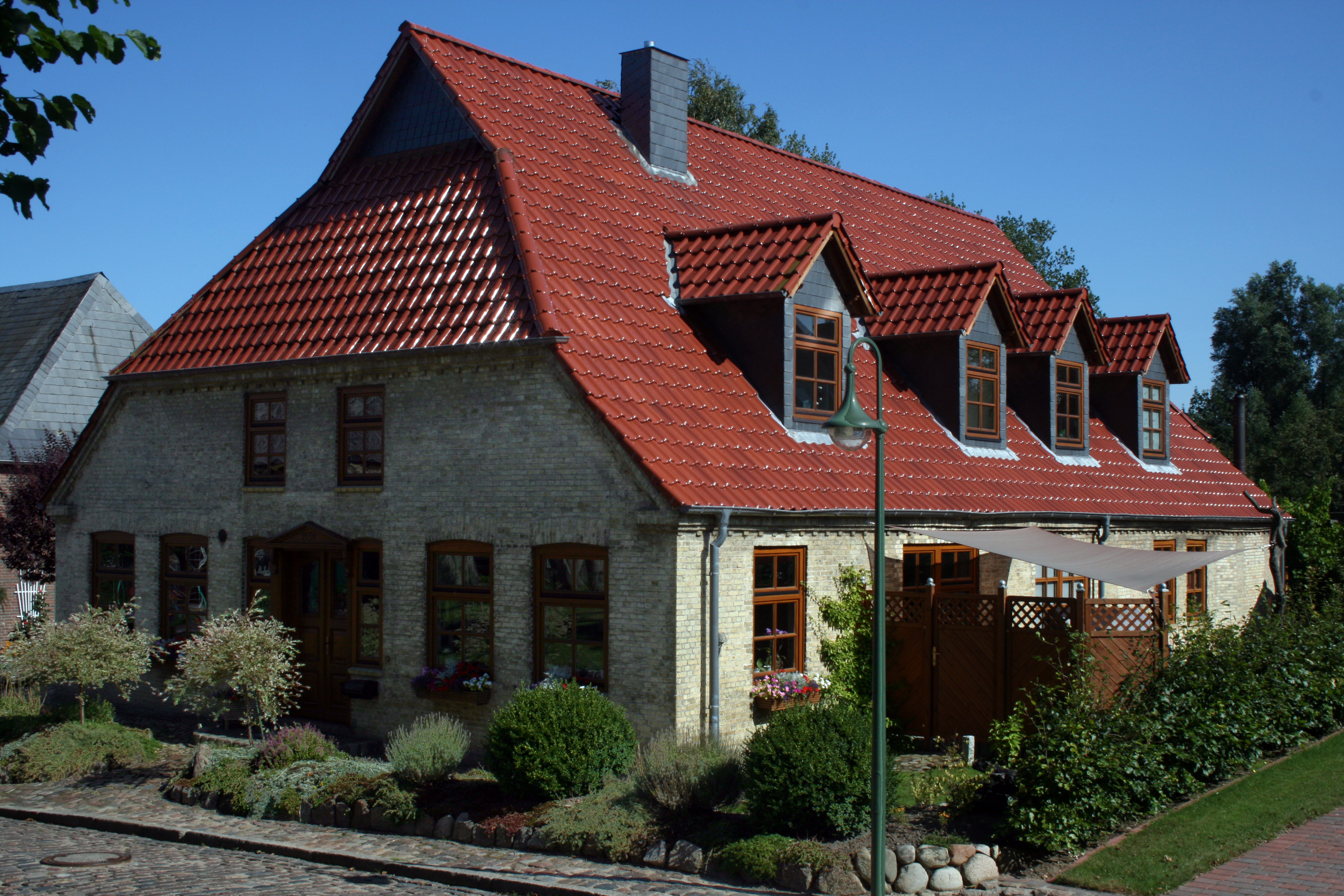
House with Dutch gable roof in Schleswig-Holstein, Germany

A Dutch gable roof or gablet roof (in Britain) is a roof with a small gable at the top of a hip roof. The term Dutch gable is also used to mean a gable with parapets. Some sources refer to this as a gable-on-hip roof.

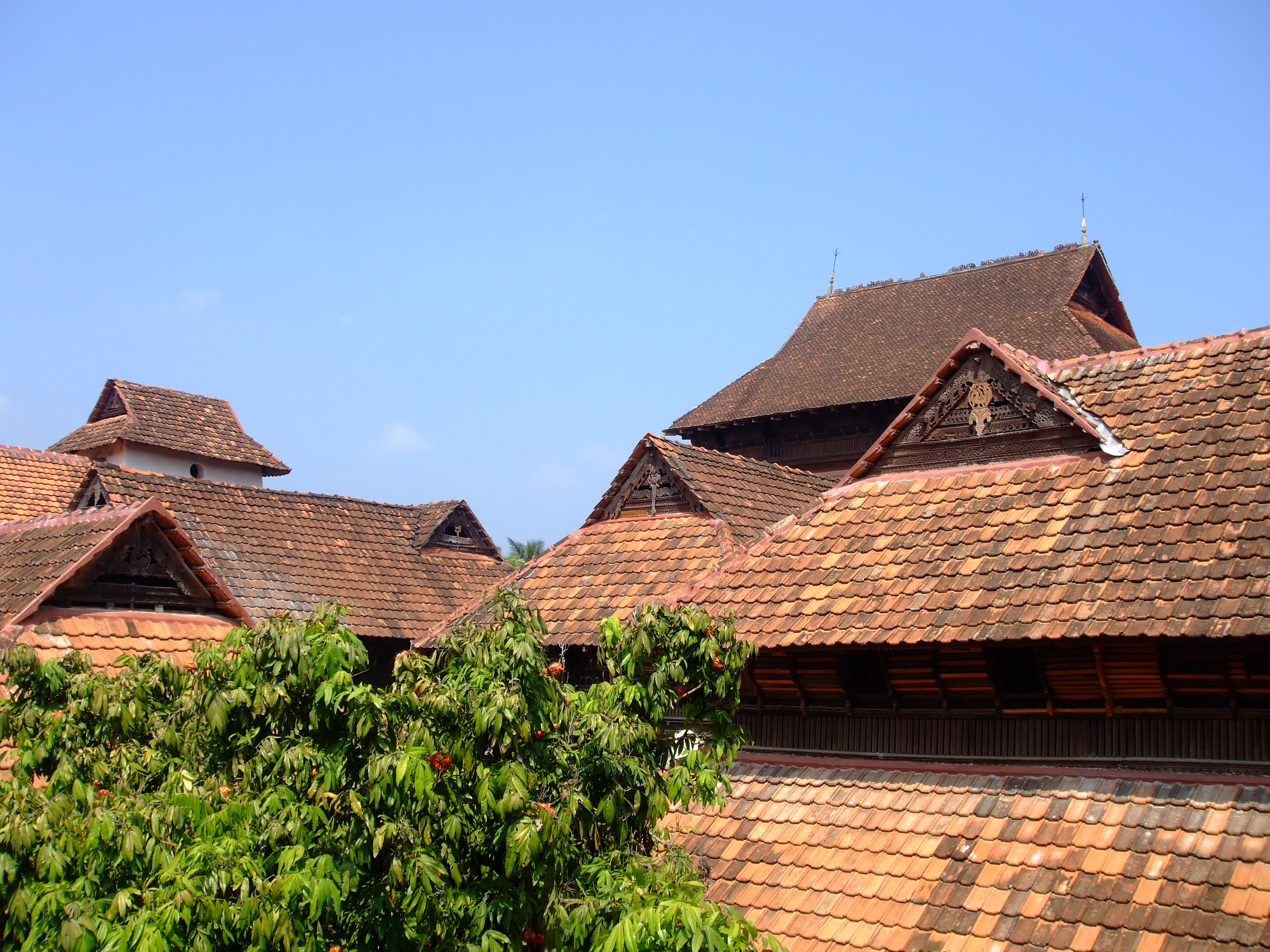
Dutch gable roof works of Padmanabhapuram Palace in India

A Dutch gable roof combines both the gable and the hip roof while adding additional architectural interest. A drawback of a hip framed roof is its reduced attic space for a given roof pitch compared to a simple gable roof. In Mediterranean climates with lower snow loads high roof pitches and their greater consumption of materials and labor are unnecessary. Simple gable roofs are also problematic, as the lower low eaves made possible by a shallow pitched hip roof provide the opportunity for both shade and rain protection in the form of an overhang or latticed porch. The shade these create keeps a structure cooler, their covered space is an attractive place for relaxation and escape from heat trapped inside, and the rain "shadow" created by overhangs greatly reduces the moisture content of the soil. This inhibits both foundation decay and subterranean termites common in these areas.

== History ==
Gable roofs were already common in Flanders in the 16th century, being the result of the architectural tradition of a region with a rainy climate where the most accessible building material was brick. The relative scarcity of wood meant that its use tended to be optimized, combining the needs of having effective roofs and being able to fit out habitable attics. The Dutch colonial expansion led to this type of roof being built in other areas of the world, especially in the settlements of the Cape and on the Atlantic coast of the United States, in the surroundings of the small town of New Amsterdam, which over time would end up becoming the city of New York.

The Dutch architectural heritage was taken up by Anglo-American home designers from the second half of the 19th century, when a current tending to recover traditional styles in the construction of luxurious country villas prevailed. This trend has continued throughout the 20th century, such that the Dutch roof has become a design element of numerous single-family suburban homes in cities around the world.

== See also ==
- List of roof shapes
- Half-hip or Dutch hip roof, which also combines elements of the hip and gable, but with the gable below the hip.
- East Asian hip-and-gable roof
