= List of Los Angeles Historic-Cultural Monuments in Silver Lake, Angelino Heights, and Echo Park =

This is a list of Los Angeles Historic-Cultural Monuments in Silver Lake, Angelino Heights, and Echo Park, Los Angeles, California. The list includes locations in Silver Lake, Angelino Heights, Echo Park, as well the Elysian Park area. There are more than 63 Historic-Cultural Monuments (HCM) in these areas. They are designated by the City's Cultural Heritage Commission.

== Historic-Cultural Monuments ==
HCM #	Landmark name	Image	Date designated	Locality	Neighborhood	Description
8	Foy House		September 21, 1962	1335-1341 1/2 Carroll Ave. 34°4′10″N 118°15′15″W	Angelino Heights	Home of Mary E. Foy, became first woman City Librarian in 1880.
48	Chavez Ravine Arboretum		April 26, 1967	Elysian Park	Elysian Park	Started in 1893, first botanical garden in Southern California.
51	Residence at 1300 Carroll Avenue		May 10, 1967	1300 Carroll Ave. 34°4′07″N 118°15′12″W	Angelino Heights	Queen Anne-Eastlake style of architecture that was built by Aaron P. Phillips in 1887.
52	Residence at 1330 Carroll Avenue		May 24, 1967	1330 Carroll Ave. 34°4′08″N 118°15′15″W	Angelino Heights	Architect Joseph Cather Newsom designed the 12-room house for dairyman Charles Sessions.
73	Residence at 1329 Carroll Avenue		February 3, 1971	1329 Carroll Ave.	Angelino Heights	Eastlake style home built in 1887 for City Councilman Daniel Innes; the family lived there for 30 years; their Innes Shoe Store prospered in Downtown. The Manor was used as the residence of the Halliwell sisters in the WB show Charmed.
74	Residence at 1345 Carroll Avenue		February 3, 1971	1345 Carroll Ave. 34°4′11″N 118°15′16″W	Angelino Heights	This was the setting of the Michael Jackson Thriller video.
808	Neutra/Maxwell House		July 8, 2005	475 N. Bowling Green Way; 34°04′03″N 118°28′37″W	Angelino Heights	First peaked roof house designed by Richard Neutra with triangular glazed gable openings, built in 1941; profoundly influenced American suburban architecture in the 1950s and 1960s; moved to Angelino Heights 2007–08
75	Residence at 1355 Carroll Avenue		February 3, 1971	1355 Carroll Ave. 34°4′11″N 118°15′17″W	Angelino Heights	Built for capitalist Harry L. Pinney in 1887; basic Eastlake style, unornamented.
76	Residence at 1316 Carroll Avenue		February 3, 1971	1316 Carroll Ave. 34°4′08″N 118°15′13″W	Angelino Heights	
77	Residence at 1320 Carroll Avenue		February 3, 1971	1320 Carroll Ave. 34°4′08″N 118°15′14″W	Angelino Heights	
78	Residence at 1324 Carroll Avenue		February 3, 1971	1324 Carroll Ave. 34°4′08″N 118°15′15″W	Angelino Heights	
79	Residence at 1344 Carroll Avenue		February 3, 1971	1344 Carroll Ave. 34°4′09″N 118°15′17″W	Angelino Heights	
109	Residence at 1325 Carroll Avenue		January 3, 1973	1325 Carroll Ave. 34°4′10″N 118°15′14″W	Angelino Heights	
110	Los Angeles Police Academy Rock Garden		January 17, 1973	1880 N. Academy Dr. 34°4′55″N 118°14′29″W	Elysian Park	
124	Tierman House		April 3, 1974	2323 Micheltorena St. 34°6′08″N 118°16′08″W	Silver Lake	
163	Animation School for the Walt Disney Studios from 1935 to 1940		July 26, 2005	2646-2656 Griffith Park Blvd.; 3027-3033 Angus St. 34°6′24″N 118°16′18″W	Griffith Park	This HCM also includes the Site of First Walt Disney Studio, across Hyperion Ave. See: List of Los Angeles Historic-Cultural Monuments in Hollywood
166	Carriage House at 1411-1417 Kellam Avenue		November 3, 1976	1411-1417 Kellam Ave. 34°4′15″N 118°15′17″W	Angelino Heights	
103	Forthmann Carriage House		October 4, 1972	812 E Edgeware Rd. 34°01′45″N 118°17′03″W	Angelino HeightsLos Angeles, California	Victorian carriage house built in the 1880s; designed by Burgess J. Reeve; relocated in 2005 from original location at 629 West 18th St. Los Angeles, California
176	Residence at 1321 Carroll Avenue		July 13, 1977	1321 Carroll Ave. 34°4′09″N 118°15′13″W	Angelino Heights	
189	Residence at 1407 Carroll Avenue		May 3, 1978	1407 Carroll Ave. 34°4′12″N 118°15′18″W	Angelino Heights	Pictured on the right
190	Residence and Carriage House at 1411 Carroll Avenue		May 3, 1978	1411 Carroll Ave. 34°4′12″N 118°15′19″W	Angelino Heights	Pictured on the left
191	Residence at 1441-1443 1/2 Carroll Avenue		May 3, 1978	1441-1443 1/2 Carroll Ave. 34°4′13″N 118°15′22″W	Angelino Heights	
206	Residence at 724 E. Edgeware Road		January 3, 1979	724 E. Edgeware Rd. 34°4′07″N 118°15′10″W	Angelino Heights	
207	Residence at 1334 Kellam Avenue		January 17, 1979	1334 Kellam Ave. 34°4′12″N 118°15′14″W	Angelino Heights	
215	Bob's Market		June 6, 1979	1222-1234 Bellevue Ave. 34°4′03″N 118°15′07″W	Angelino Heights	This unusual orientalized commercial architecture is an example of a 1910 neighborhood grocery store.
216	Residence at 915-917 Douglas Street		June 6, 1979	915-917 Douglas St. 34°4′15″N 118°15′15″W	Angelino Heights	
217	Residence at 1101 Douglas Street		June 6, 1979	1101 Douglas St. 34°4′22″N 118°15′12″W	Angelino Heights	
218	Residence at 945 E. Edgeware Road		June 6, 1979	945 E. Edgeware Rd. 34°4′15″N 118°15′12″W	Angelino Heights	
219	Residence at 1239-1247 Boston Street		June 6, 1979	1239-1247 Boston St. 34°4′00″N 118°15′11″W	Angelino Heights	
220	Residence at 1343 Kellam Avenue		June 6, 1979	1343 Kellam Ave. 34°4′14″N 118°15′14″W	Angelino Heights	
221	Residence and Carriage House at 1347-1349 Kellam Avenue		June 6, 1979	1347-1349 Kellam Ave. 34°4′14″N 118°15′15″W	Angelino Heights	Featured on Season 5, Episode 5 of The Office as the house the character Holly moved into.
222	Residence at 1405-1411 Kellam Avenue		June 6, 1979	1405-1411 Kellam Ave. 34°4′15″N 118°15′16″W	Angelino Heights	
223	Residence at 822-826 E. Kensington Road		June 20, 1979	822-826 E. Kensington Rd. 34°4′18″N 118°15′07″W	Angelino Heights	
236	Sunset Boulevard Bridge		April 9, 1981	Sunset Blvd. over Silver Lake Blvd.	Silver Lake	Constructed in 1934; featuring beautiful Romanesque arches and detailing.
256	Mack Sennett Studios		November 5, 1982	1712 N. Glendale Blvd.; 2110 Aaron St. 34°5′10″N 118°15′33″W	Echo Park	
257	Residence at 817-821 N. Glendale Boulevard		November 5, 1982	817-821 N. Glendale Blvd. 34°4′25″N 118°15′43″W	Silver Lake	
266	Collins Residence		June 10, 1983	890-892 W. Kensington Rd. 34°4′23″N 118°15′13″W	Angelino Heights	
321	Eastlake Inn		May 20, 1987	1093 W. Edgeware Rd.; 1442 Kellam Ave. 34°4′15″N 118°15′21″W	Angelino Heights	
337	Engine Company No. 56		January 12, 1988	2838 Rowena Ave. 34°6′26″N 118°15′57″W	Silver Lake	
391	Canfield-Moreno Estate		October 4, 1988	1923 Micheltorena St. 34°5′41″N 118°16′16″W	Silver Lake	
399	Bates House		November 29, 1988	1415 Carroll Ave. 34°4′12″N 118°15′20″W	Angelino Heights	Constructed in 1893 on Pico Boulevard, Moved to 725 S. Bernal Avenue, Los Angeles in 1921. Moved to Carroll Avenue in 1988.
422	Silverlake and Ivanhoe Reservoir		March 31, 1989	Armstrong Ave. & Silverlake Blvd. 34°5′34″N 118°15′56″W	Silver Lake	A former reservoir, now retained largely for its scenic value, for which the neighborhood is named.
504	Barlow Sanitorium		October 9, 1990	2000 Stadium Way; 34°4′33″N 118°14′53″W	Elysian Park	
605	Old Fire Station #6		November 1, 1994	534 E. Edgeware Rd. 34°4′02″N 118°15′15″W	Angelino Heights	Originally located at 1279 Temple Street; built in 1929; 2-story Mediterranean style masonry structure.
640	Richard and Dion Neutra VDL Research House		March 18, 1997	2300 Silver Lake Blvd. 34°5′54″N 118°15′37″W	Silver Lake	
652	Jensens Recreation Center and Electric Roof Sign		September 18, 1998	1700 W. Sunset Blvd. 34°4′37″N 118°15′31″W	Echo Park	
676	Neutra Office Building		April 25, 2000	2379 Glendale Blvd. 34°5′58″N 118°15′33″W	Silver Lake	This 1950 building was owned and designed by Modernist architect Richard Neutra.
699	August House		September 20, 2000	1664 N. Maltman Ave. 34°5′31″N 118°16′30″W	Silver Lake	
704	John R. Hunt House		October 23, 2001	2055 N. West Silver Lake Dr. 34°5′46″N 118°16′00″W	Silver Lake	
739	J.M. Haff 4-Plex		December 17, 2002	1121 W. Marion Ave. 34°4′05″N 118°15′03″W		
770	Red Car Trestle Footings		December 17, 2003	Fletcher Dr & Riverside Dr.		
823	Marshall Flats		November 2, 2005	792-796 E. Kensington Rd. 34°4′14″N 118°15′05″W		
824	Mary E. Stilson Residence		November 2, 2005	1048 W. Kensington Rd. 34°4′20″N 118°15′29″W		
827	Arthur B. Benton Residence		November 2, 2005	801-805 E. Kensington Rd. 34°4′15″N 118°15′07″W	Angelino Heights	
831	Luby and Anastasia Bubeshko Apartments		January 25, 2006	2036-2048 Griffith Park Blvd. 34°5′53″N 118°16′22″W		
836	Echo Park		March 1, 2006	751 N. Echo Park Ave. 34°4′23″N 118°15′36″W	Echo Park	
837	Droste House		March 1, 2006	2025 N. Kenilworth Ave. 34°5′46″N 118°16′04″W	Silver Lake	
839	Paul Landacre Cabin and Grounds		March 17, 2006	2006 W. El Moran St. 34°5′50″N 118°15′01″W		
844	Purviance Residence		June 21, 2006	944-944 1/2 N. Maltman Ave. 34°5′08″N 118°16′46″W		
856	Skinner House		October 25, 2006	1530 North Easterly Terrace; 34°5′13″N 118°16′07″W		
868	O'Neill Duplex No. 1		May 16, 2007	2342-2344 West Cove Ave. 34°5′42″N 118°15′39″W	Silver Lake	
892	Nin-Pole Residence		October 30, 2007	2335 Hidalgo Ave. 34°5′55″N 118°15′25″W	Silver Lake	
895	How House		November 20, 2007	2422 N. Silver Ridge Ave. 34°6′03″N 118°15′18″W		Built by Rudolf M. Schindler for James Eads How.
897	Haven of Rest		December 5, 2007	2432 North Hyperion Ave. 34°6′12″N 118°16′22″W	Silver Lake	Nautical-theme two-story building.
907	North Broadway-Buena Vista Street Bridge, No. 53C0545		January 30, 2008	N. Broadway between Elysian Park Dr. and Pasadena Ave.	Lincoln Height	
922	Edward A. "Tink" Adams House		July 2, 2008	2331 Cove Ave. 34°5′43.11″N 118°15′37.32″W	Silver Lake	International style and traditional Japanese design, 1966. Residence of the founder of the Art Center College of Design.
938	Scott Avenue Court		November 7, 2008	1463-69 4/5 Scott Ave. 34°4′43.58″N 118°15′8.85″W	Echo Park	Spanish Colonial Revival style 10-unit bungalow, built 1927-1930.
939	Black Cat Tavern		November 7, 2008	3909 W. Sunset Blvd. 34°5′31.43″N 118°16′47.92″W	Silver Lake	Art deco, built 1939, site of an early gay rights demonstration in 1967.
949	Bank of America, Echo Park Branch		April 10, 2009	1572 W. Sunset Blvd. 34°4′35.71″N 118°15′26.19″W	Echo Park	Built 1908, Beaux Arts redesign in 1926.
950	Original Echo Park Clubhouse		April 10, 2009	100 N. Echo Park Ave.	Echo Park	Craftsman style, 1908.
964	Ross House		September 23, 2009	2123 N. Valentine St. 34°5′22.03″N 118°14′53.83″W	Elysian Heights	International style, 1938, by Raphael Soriano.
965	Wilson House		September 23, 2009	2090 N. Redcliff St. 34°5′51.74″N 118°16′9.92″W	Silver Lake	International style, 1938, by Rudolph Schindler.
967	Lipetz House		September 23, 2009	1843 N. Dillon St. 34°5′36.55″N 118°16′11.77″W	Silver Lake	Raphael Soriano's first residential work, 1936, in Streamline Moderne and International style.
971	Villa Palombo-Togneri		January 27, 2010	2508 Mayberry St. 34°5′4.11″N 118°15′55.78″W	Silver Lake	Innocenti Palombo built this Mediterranean Revival/Beaux Arts house in 1927 as a representation of a villa in his hometown of Vicalvi, Italy.
972	Shire Art House		January 27, 2010	2354 S. Vista Gordo Dr. 34°5′29.22″N 118°14′41.62″W	Echo Park	Minimal Traditional style, built in 1938, decorated by sculptor Peter Shire.
973	Henry Shire Residence		January 27, 2010	2208 Princeton Ave. 34°5′28.01″N 118°14′51.93″W	Echo Park	International style, built in 1949, architect Josef Van der Kar, landscape designer Garrett Eckbo.
986	Lento Brick Court			1288 W. Sunset Blvd. 34°4′15.65″N 118°15′3.37″W	Echo Park	Designed in 1928 by Conrad Martin Ellington and Frank B. Chambers.
986	1109 Coronado Terrace House		April 2015	1109 N Coronado Terrace	Silver Lake	A Craftsman-style home built in 1910 with an arroyo stone porch and pillars, arroyo stone walls
1135	TOM House		November 23, 2016	1419-1421 Laveta Terrace; 34.076553°N 118.255417°W	Echo Park	A 1911 Craftsman-style home which served as the studio and residence of artist Tom of Finland from 1980 to 1990.

== Non-HCM historic sites recognized by state and nation ==
Code	Landmark name	Image	Date designated	Locality	Neighborhood	Description
2323	1300 block of Carroll Avenue			Carroll Ave. between Edgeware and Douglas Sts.	Angelino Heights	Street of Victorian-era houses; often used in movies and TV; includes house used in TV show Charmed
2504	Garbutt House		July 22, 1987	1809 Apex Ave. 34°5′23″N 118°15′45″W	Silver Lake	20-room mansion with roof and walls built of concrete, steel-reinforced doors and no fireplaces due to the owner's fear of fire

== See also ==
- Bibliography of Los Angeles
- Outline of the history of Los Angeles
- Bibliography of California history

=== Lists of L.A. Historic-Cultural Monuments ===
- Historic-Cultural Monuments in Downtown Los Angeles
- Historic-Cultural Monuments on the East and Northeast Sides
- Historic-Cultural Monuments in the Harbor area
- Historic-Cultural Monuments in Hollywood
- Historic-Cultural Monuments in the San Fernando Valley
- Historic-Cultural Monuments in South Los Angeles
- Historic-Cultural Monuments on the Westside
- Historic-Cultural Monuments in the Wilshire and Westlake areas

=== Other ===
- City of Los Angeles' Historic Preservation Overlay Zones
- National Register of Historic Places listings in Los Angeles
- National Register of Historic Places listings in Los Angeles County
- List of California Historical Landmarks
