= Polito House =

House in Los Angeles, California

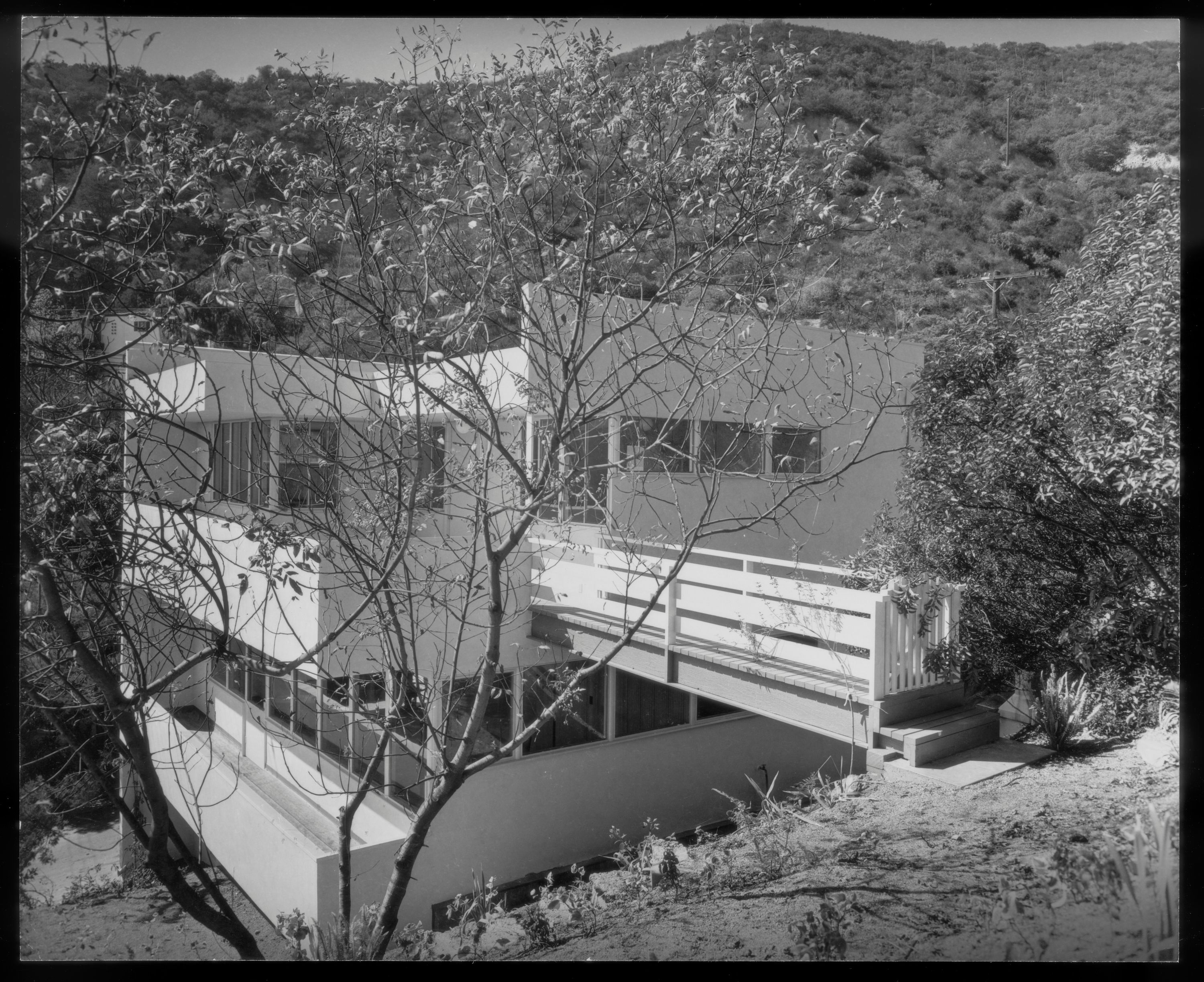

- Location within the Los Angeles metropolitan area
- 34.10054°N 118.377243°W
- Location: 1650 Queens Road, West Hollywood, California

History
- Built: 1940

Site notes
- Architect: Raphael Soriano
- Governing body: private

Los Angeles Historic-Cultural Monument
- Reference no.: 1100

The Polito House is a house in Los Angeles, California, United States. Designed by Raphael Soriano, it was built in 1938 and completed in 1940.

The house and its recent renovation was featured in the October 2025 issue of Architectural Digest.

Located on a street-to-street lot on Queens Road, it features a continuous band of horizontal steel casement windows, swimming pool, sunning platforms and bridge to terraced gardens. A key feature was a 10' x 20' sandblasted window that allowed light to reach the interior stairwell while providing privacy.

According to the Triangle Modernist Houses, the International-style residence was spotlighted in the February 1946 issue of Architectural Record.

The Politio House is one of only 12 of 50 buildings remaining by Raphael Soriano, with demolition, earthquakes and wildfire all taking their toll on the rest.

The house was photographed by American architectural photographer Julius Shulman in 1940.

== History and Renovation ==
In 2020, the house was purchased by entrepreneur Leo Seigal and his husband Maxwell Anderson. At the time, much of the house’s original interior detailing had been removed, leaving only Soriano’s structural “bones.”

Working with interior designer Jake Arnold, the couple undertook a comprehensive renovation that reorganized the 1,500-square-foot residence. The reconfiguration introduced a dedicated primary suite, a combined library and office, and updated bathrooms, while maintaining the modernist character of the kitchen and main living spaces.

The project also emphasized the house’s relationship to its steep hillside site. The surrounding grounds, which had been barren when the owners acquired the property, were redesigned to restore an “oasis” quality and to better connect the home to outdoor spaces. A bridge still links a cantilevered terrace to a dining area.

The renovation has been described as continuing Soriano’s modernist legacy while adapting the residence to contemporary domestic life.
