= Carroll Avenue =

Historic house in California, United States

- Carroll Avenue, 1300 Block
- U.S. National Register of Historic Places
- U.S. Historic district
- Los Angeles Historic-Cultural Monument
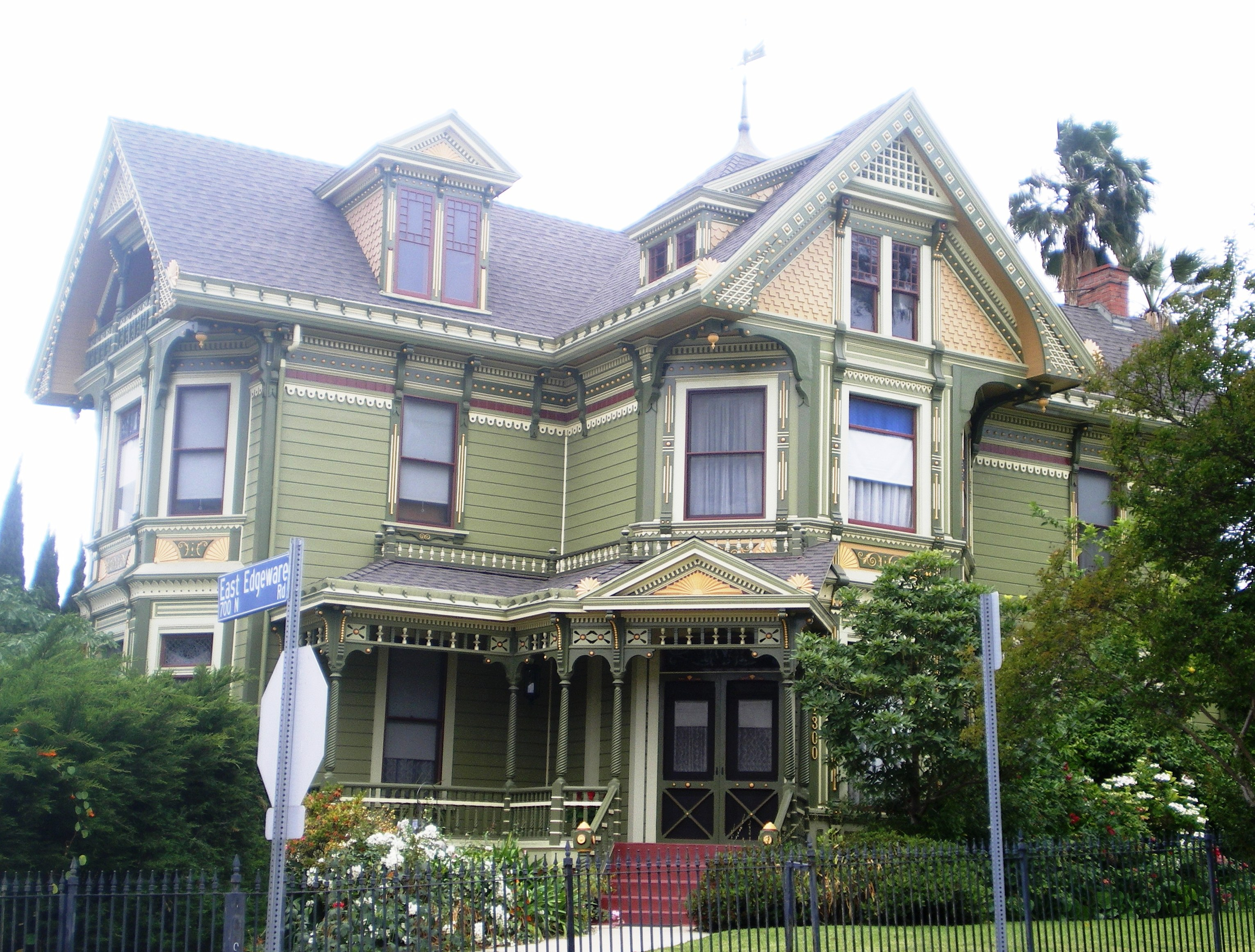
- House at 1300 Carroll Avenue

- Location within Los Angeles Location within the Los Angeles metropolitan area Location within California Location within the United States
- Location: Los Angeles, California
- Coordinates: 34°4′10.54″N 118°15′17.37″W
- Built: 1887
- Architect: Newsom, Joseph C.
- Architectural style: Bungalow/American Craftsman, Stick/Eastlake, Queen Anne
- NRHP reference No.: 76000488

Significant dates
- Added to NRHP: April 22, 1976
- Designated LAHCM: See below

Carroll Avenue is a street in Angelino Heights, one of the older neighborhoods of Los Angeles. It consists of Victorian-era houses, and is located within a picturesque neighborhood that has served as the backdrop for countless motion pictures.

== History ==
Carroll Avenue is one of Los Angeles' first suburbs, and bears its name well, as it brings the city many tourists and visitors. The houses, or rather Victorian manors, are now used as private homes, as they were in the 19th century. Some of the more well known residents from the Victorian era include: merchant Aaron P. Philips in 1887, real estate agent Charles C. Haskin in 1894, and warehouse operator Michael Sanders in 1887. One of Los Angeles' first City Councilmen, Daniel Innes, resided at 1329 Carroll Avenue.

The house at 1345 Carroll Avenue was used in the final scene of Michael Jackson's Thriller.

The house at 1329 Carroll Avenue was used as the home for the main characters in the supernatural drama television series Charmed.

The house at 1324 Carroll Avenue was used for the main home in Adam Sandler's 2006 comedy Grandma's Boy.

== Historic designations ==
The entire 1300 block of Carroll Avenue was listed under the National Register of Historic Places in 1976.

Several individual residences along Carroll Avenue have been named as Los Angeles Historic-Cultural Monuments, including the following:

- 1337 Carroll Avenue (September 1962)
- 1330 Carroll Avenue (May 24, 1967)
- 1329 Carroll Avenue (February 3, 1971)
- 1345 Carroll Avenue (February 3, 1971)
- 1355 Carroll Avenue (February 3, 1971)
- 1316 Carroll Avenue (February 3, 1971)
- 1320 Carroll Avenue (February 3, 1971)
- 1324 Carroll Avenue (February 3, 1971)
- 1344 Carroll Avenue (February 3, 1971)
- 1325 Carroll Avenue (January 3, 1973)
- 1321 Carroll Avenue (July 13, 1977)
- 1407 Carroll Avenue (May 3, 1978)
- 1411 Carroll Avenue (May 3, 1978)

== Gallery of Homes on Carroll Avenue ==
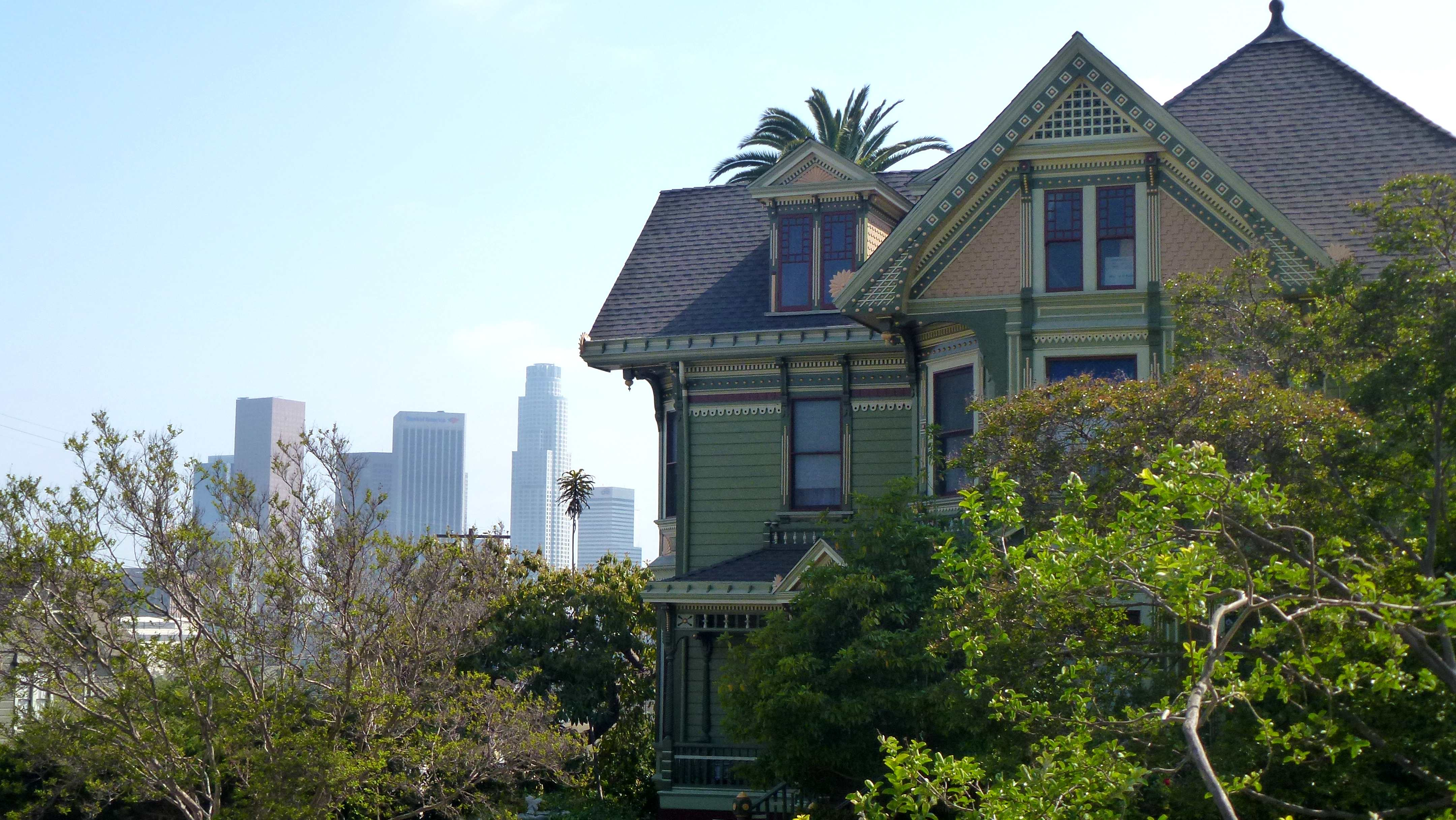
Phillips house and Downtown L.A.

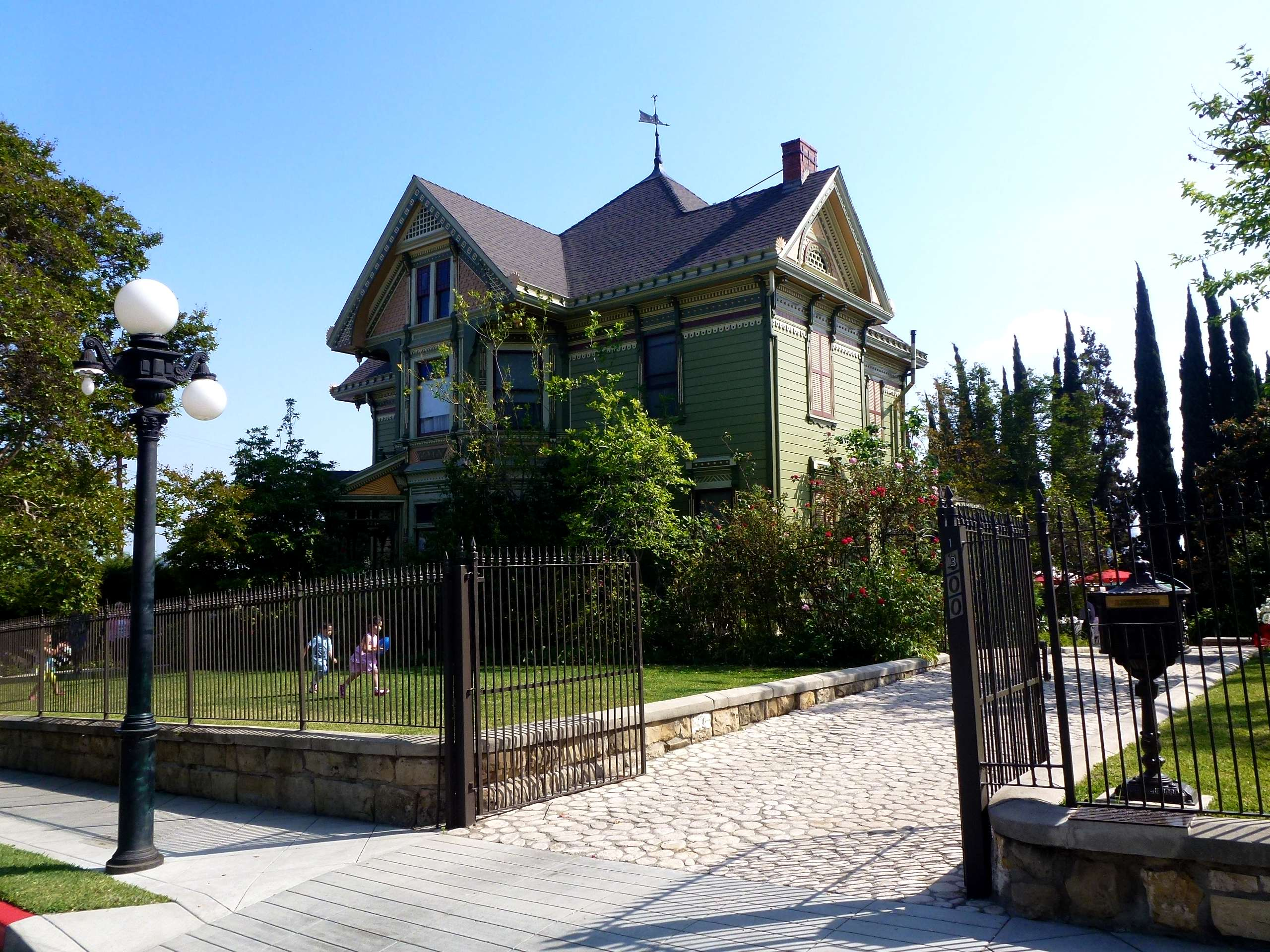
Phillips house, 1300 Carroll Street ( 1887 )

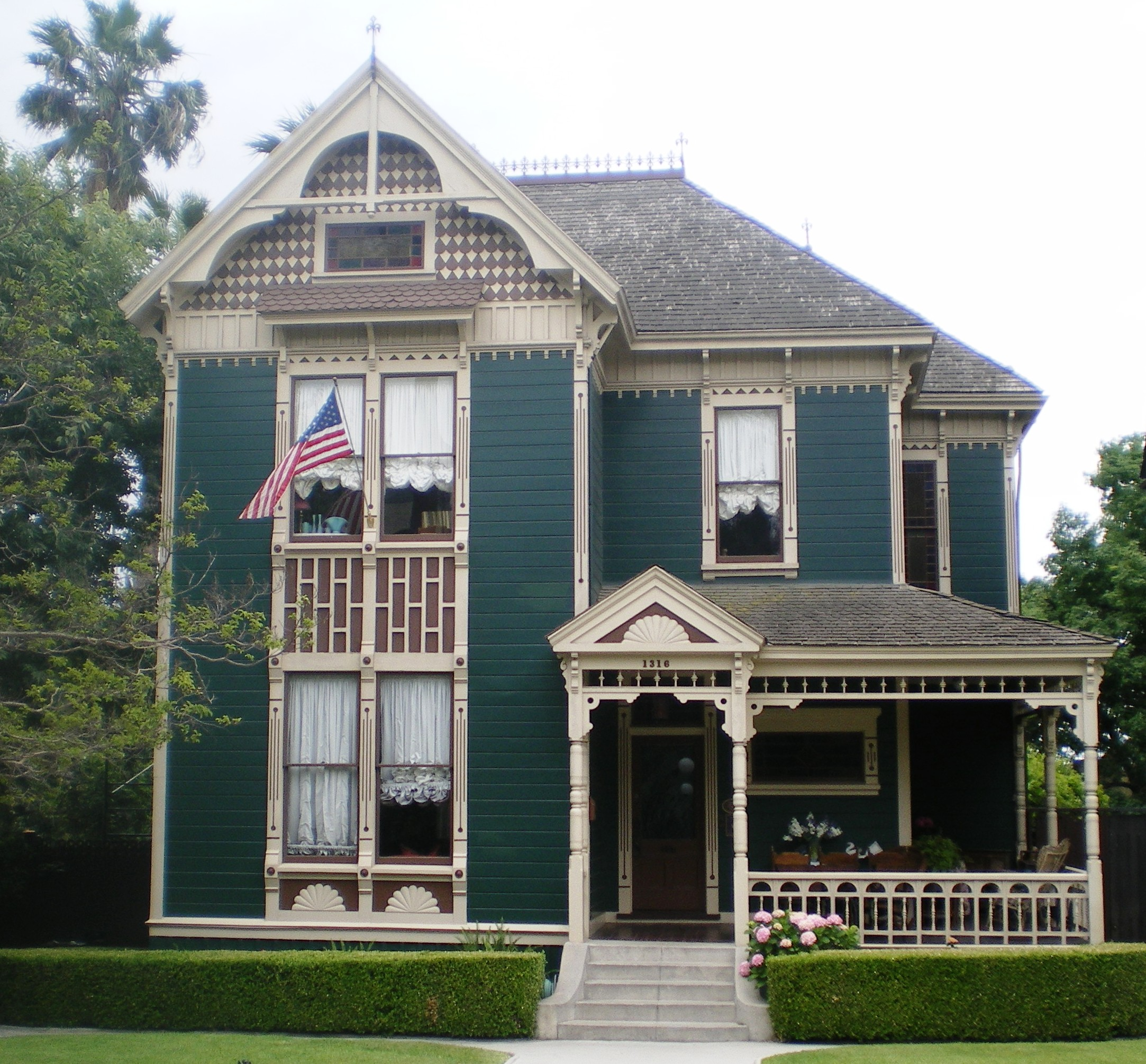
House at 1316 Carroll Ave.

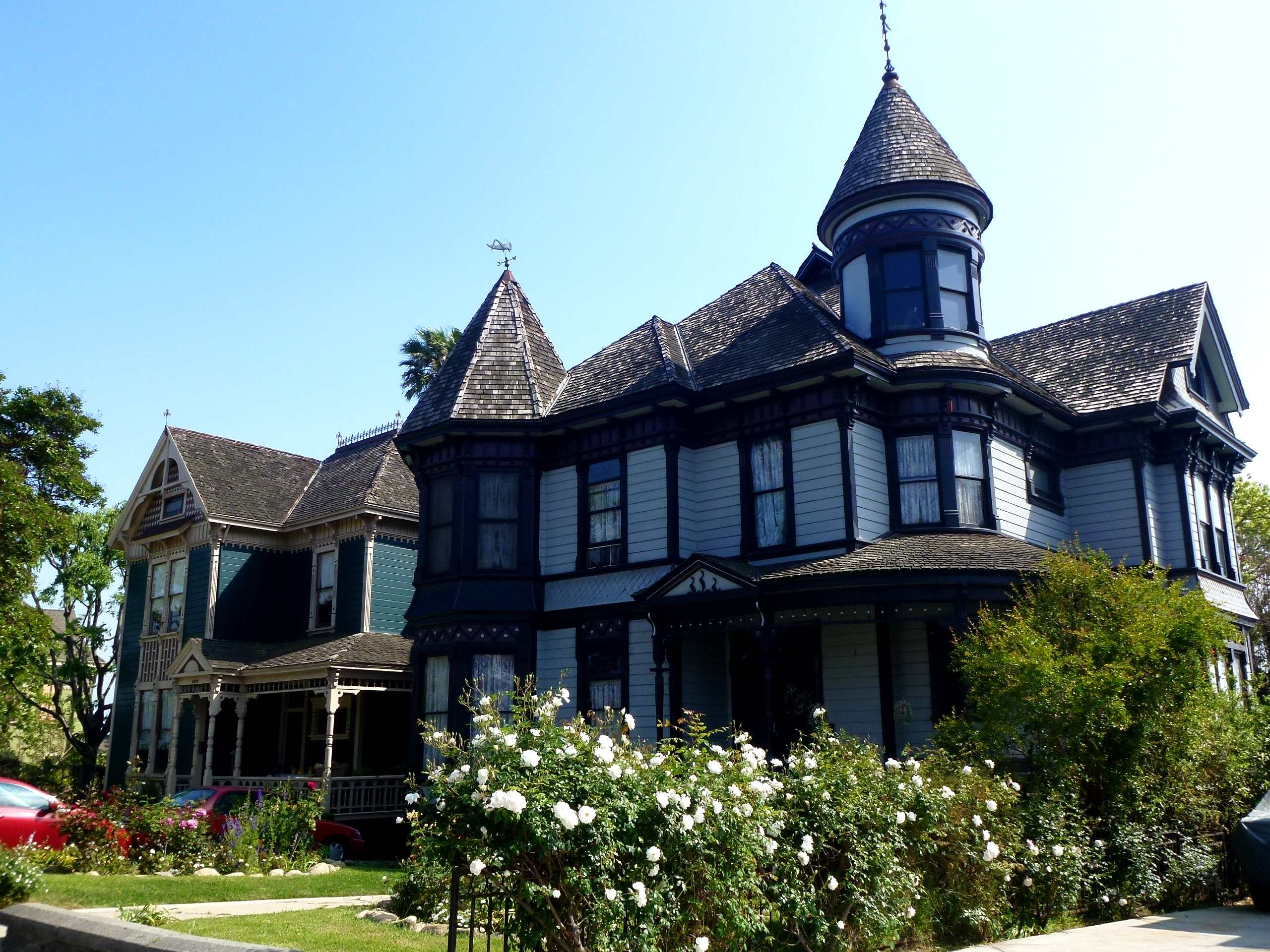
Heim House, 1320 Carroll Avenue (1888)

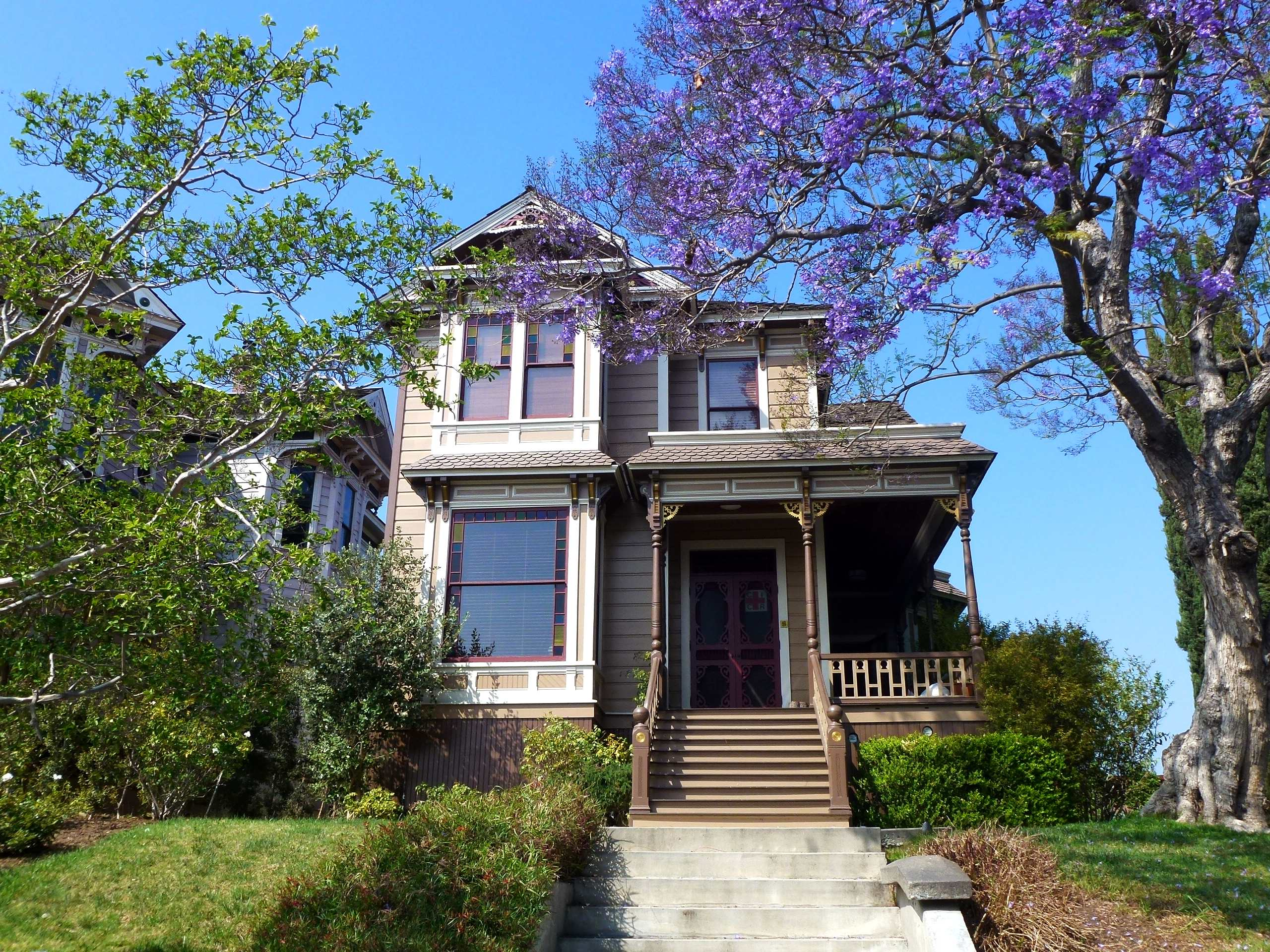
1321 Carroll Avenue

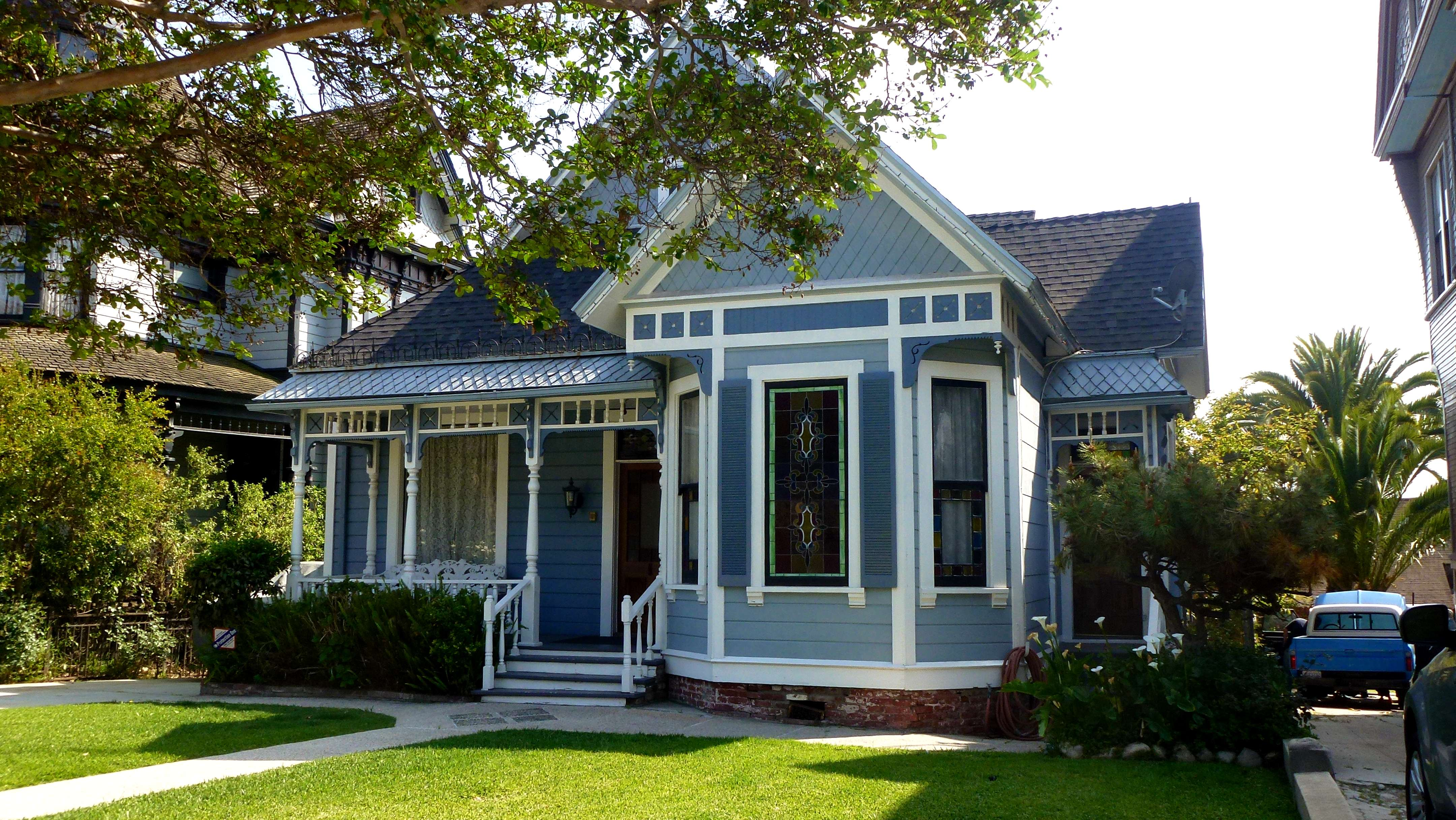
Scheerer House, 1324 Carroll Avenue

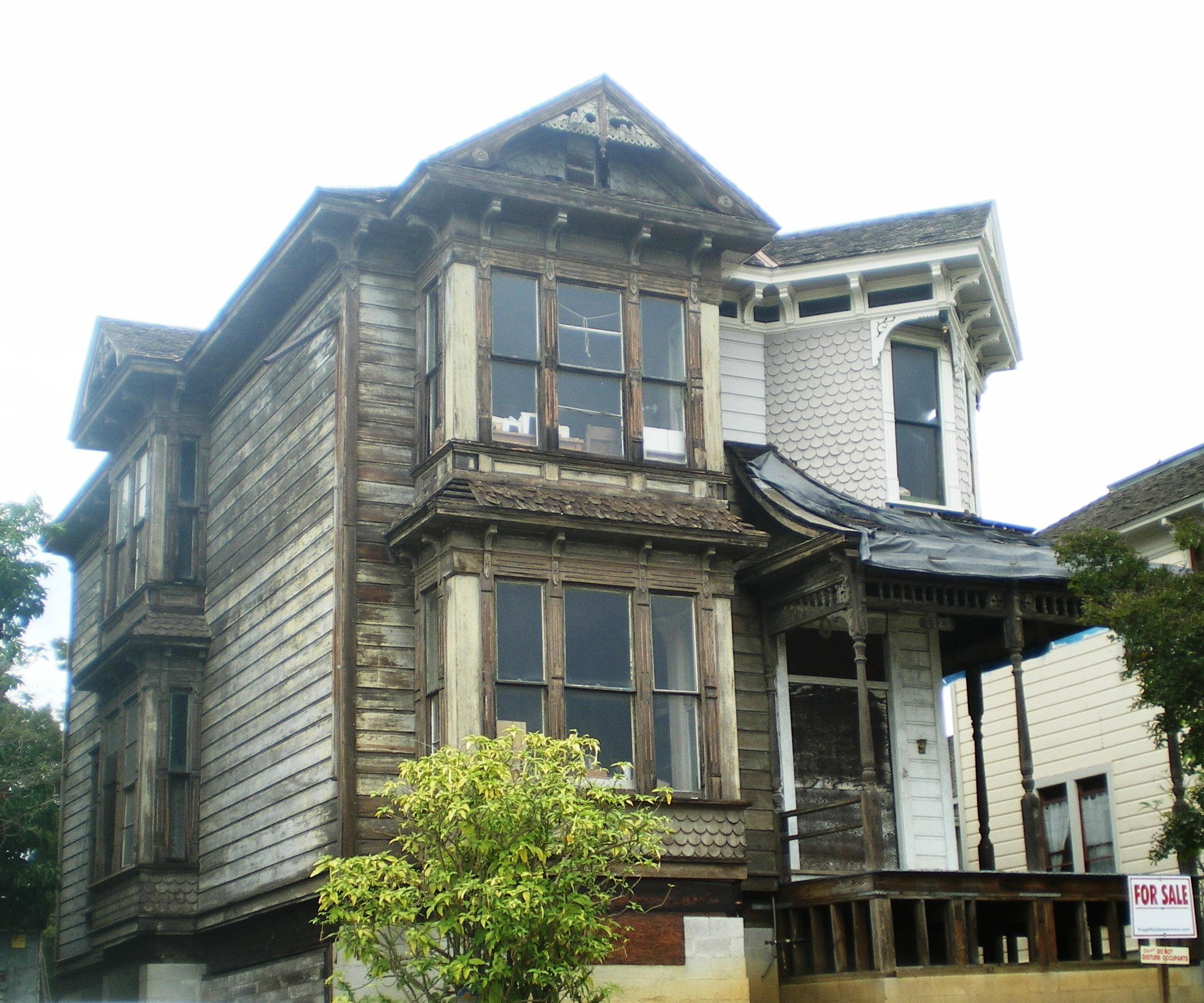
House at 1325 Carroll Ave.

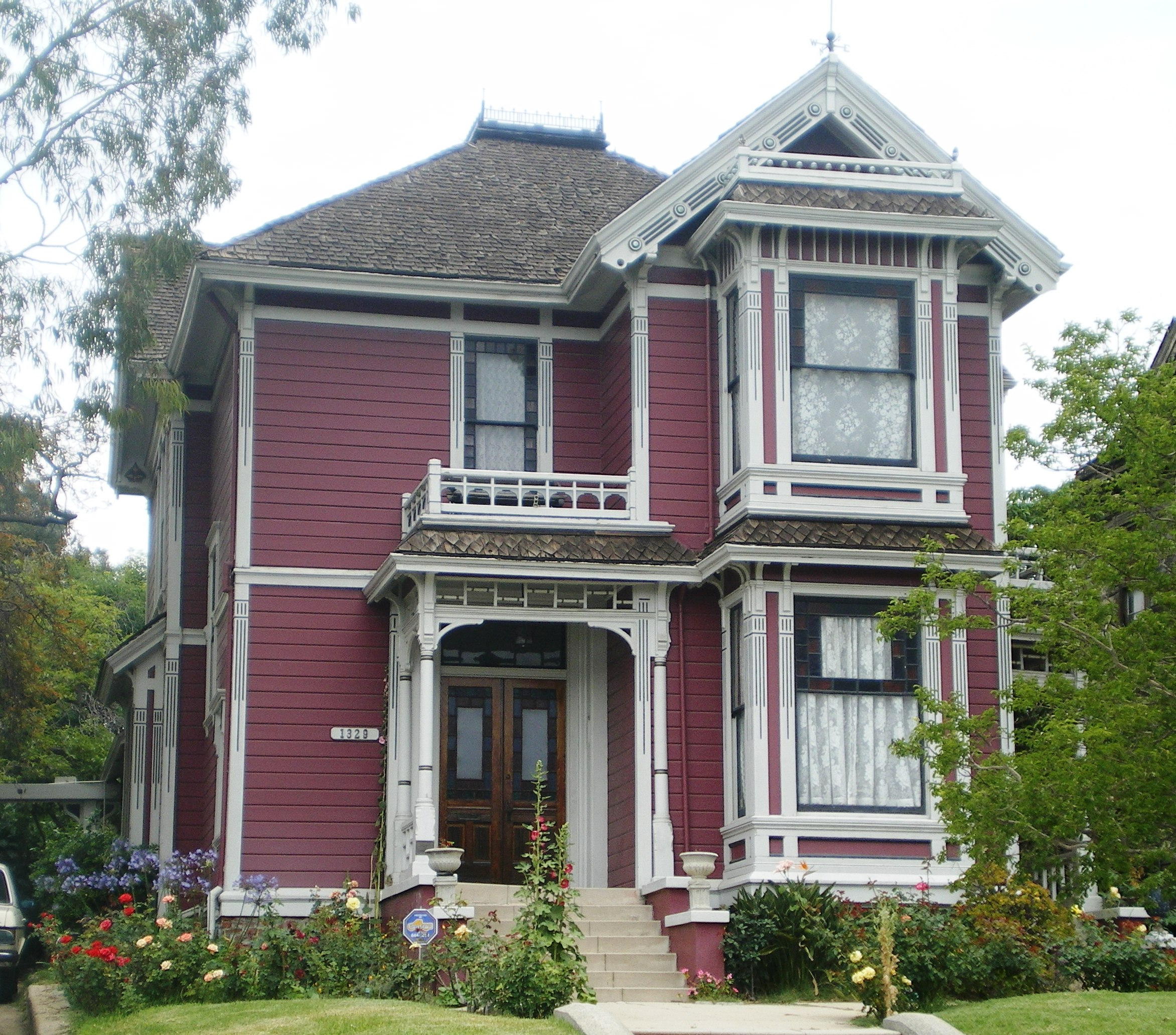
Innes House (Charmed House) at 1329 Carroll Ave. (1887)

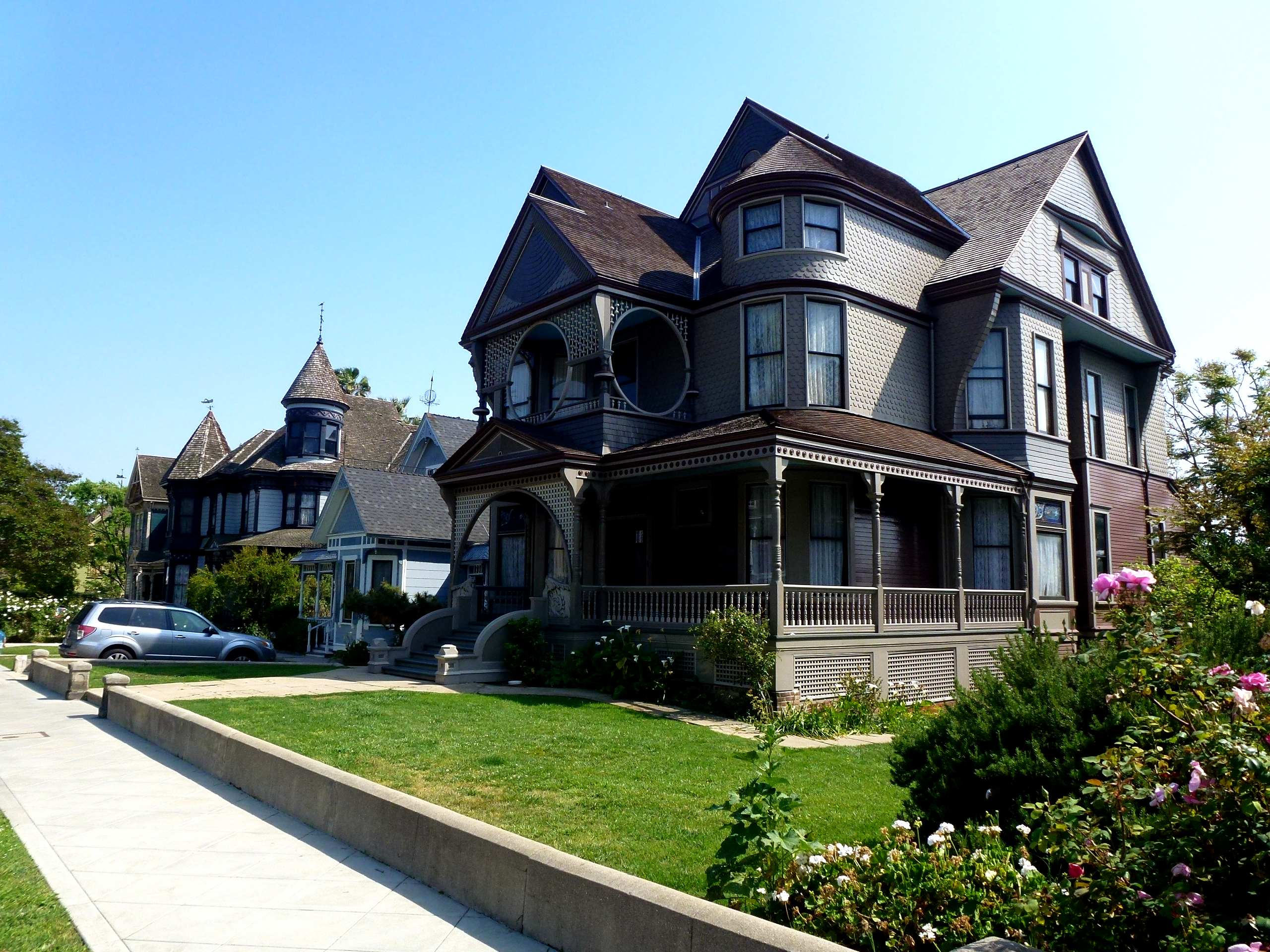
Sessions House, 1330 Carroll Avenue (Joseph Cather Newsom, (1888)

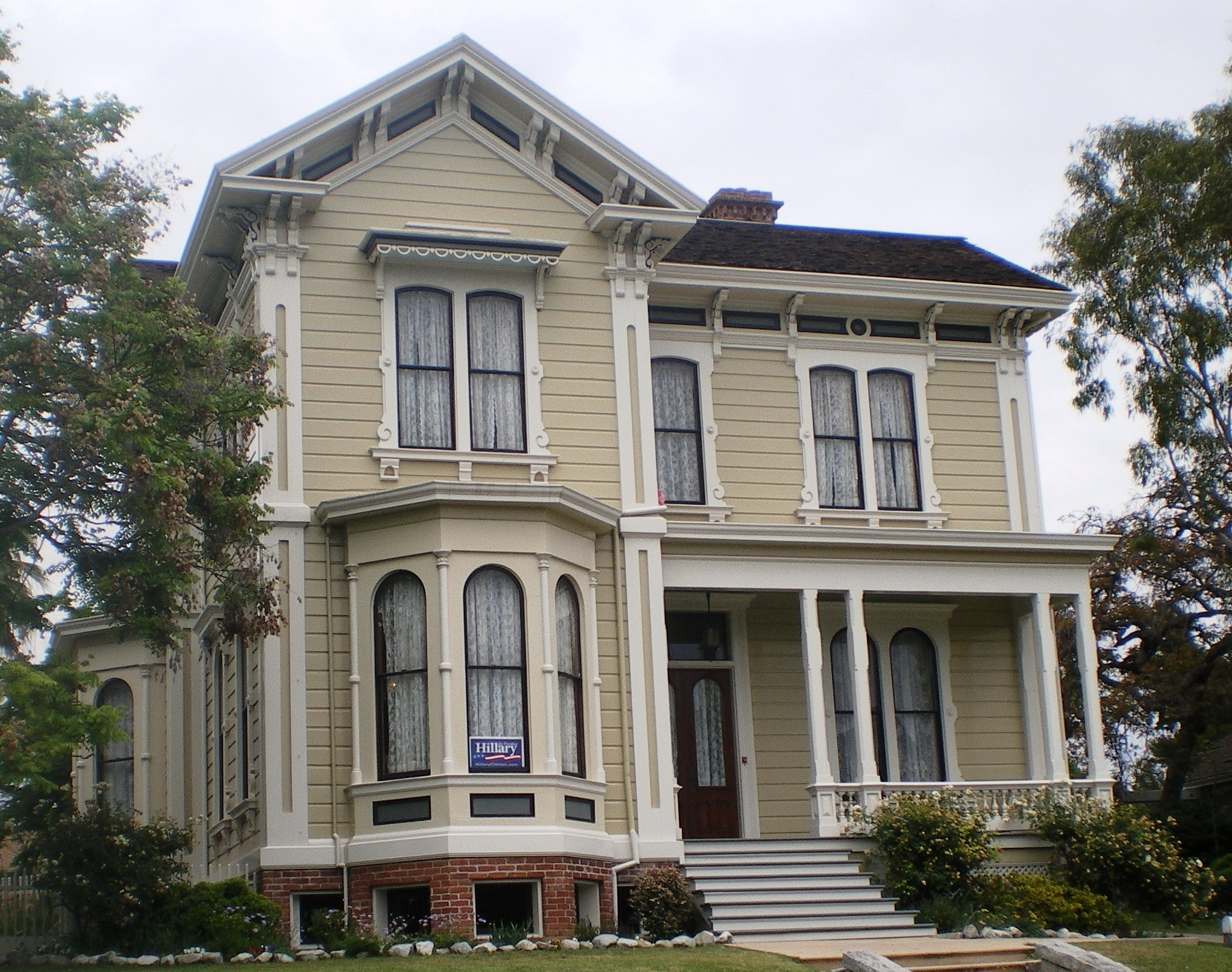
Foy House at 1337 Carroll Avenue (1872)

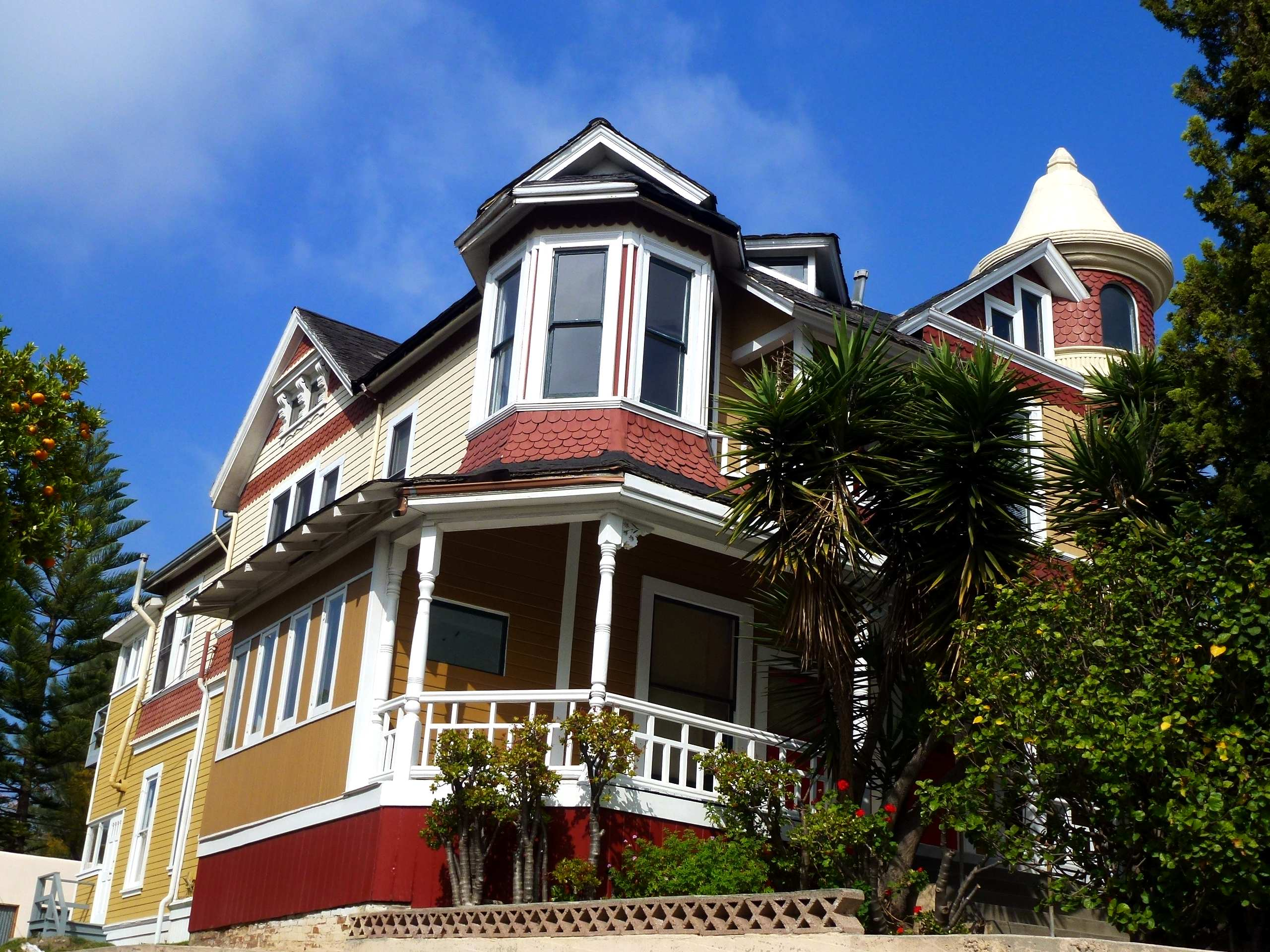
Cohn House, 1443 Carroll Avenue (1887)

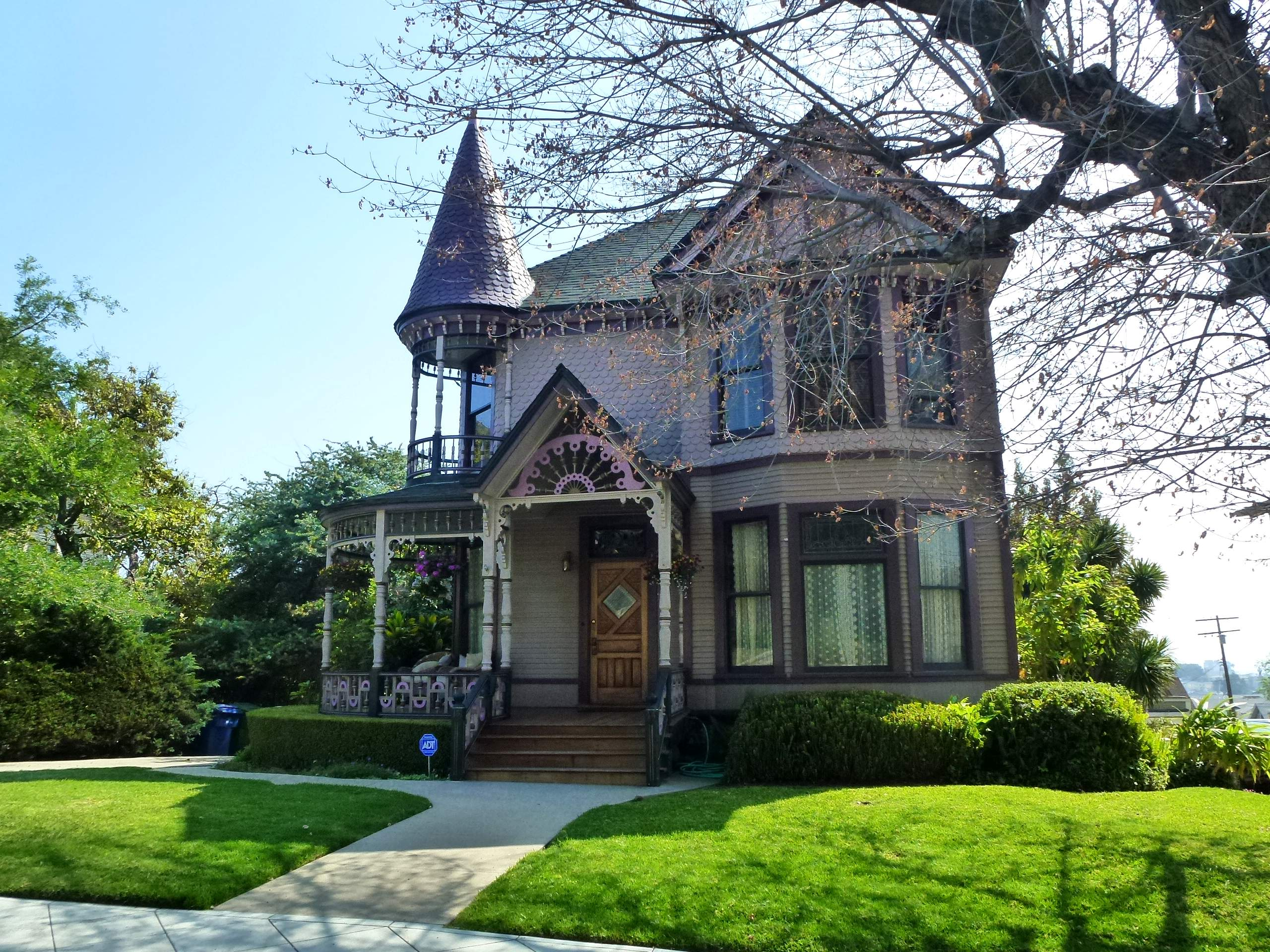
Haskins House, 1344 Carroll Avenue (1888)

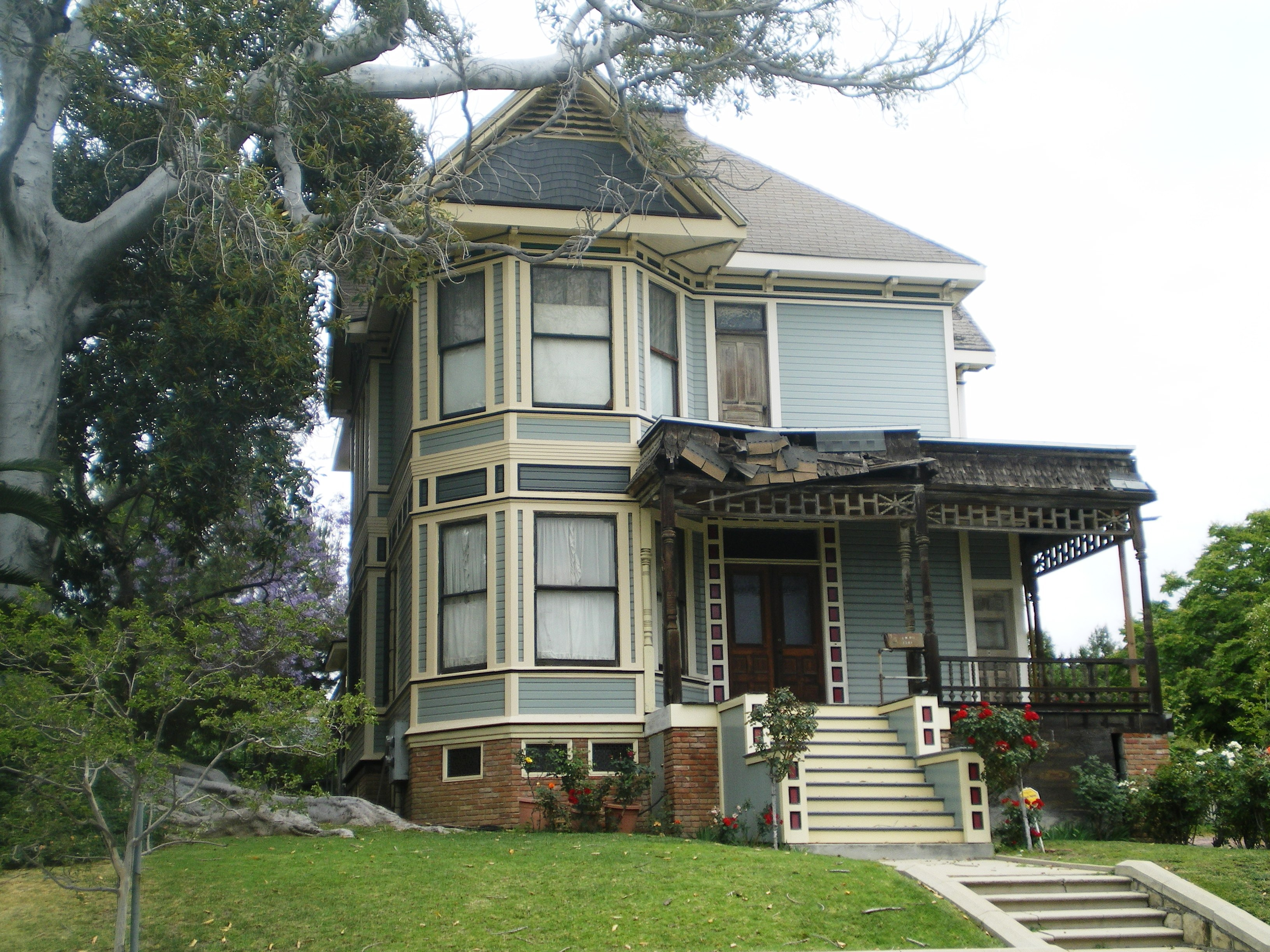
House at 1345 Carroll Ave.

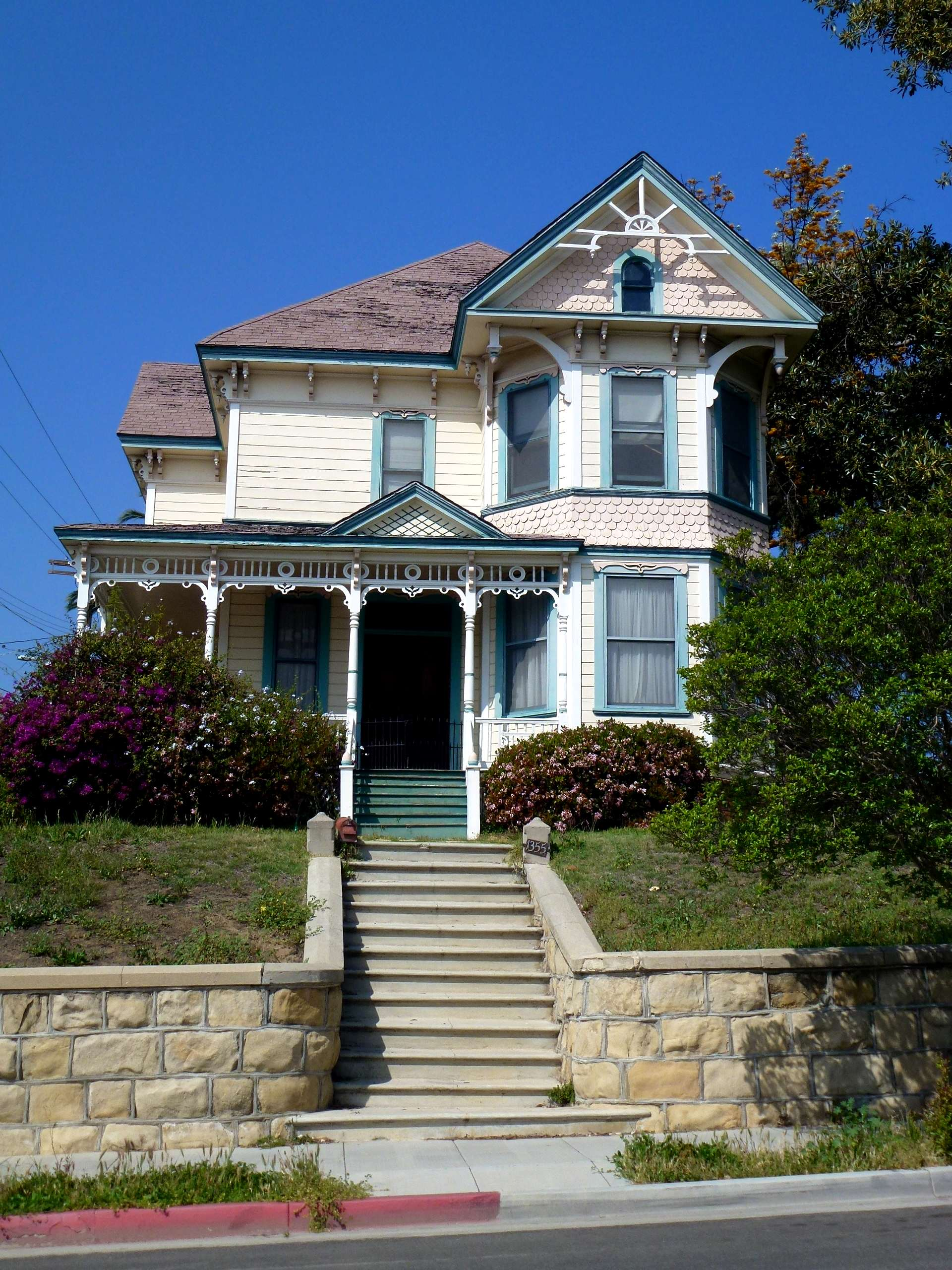
Pinney House, (Mad Men -Don Draper flashback S6E13) at 1355 Carroll Avenue

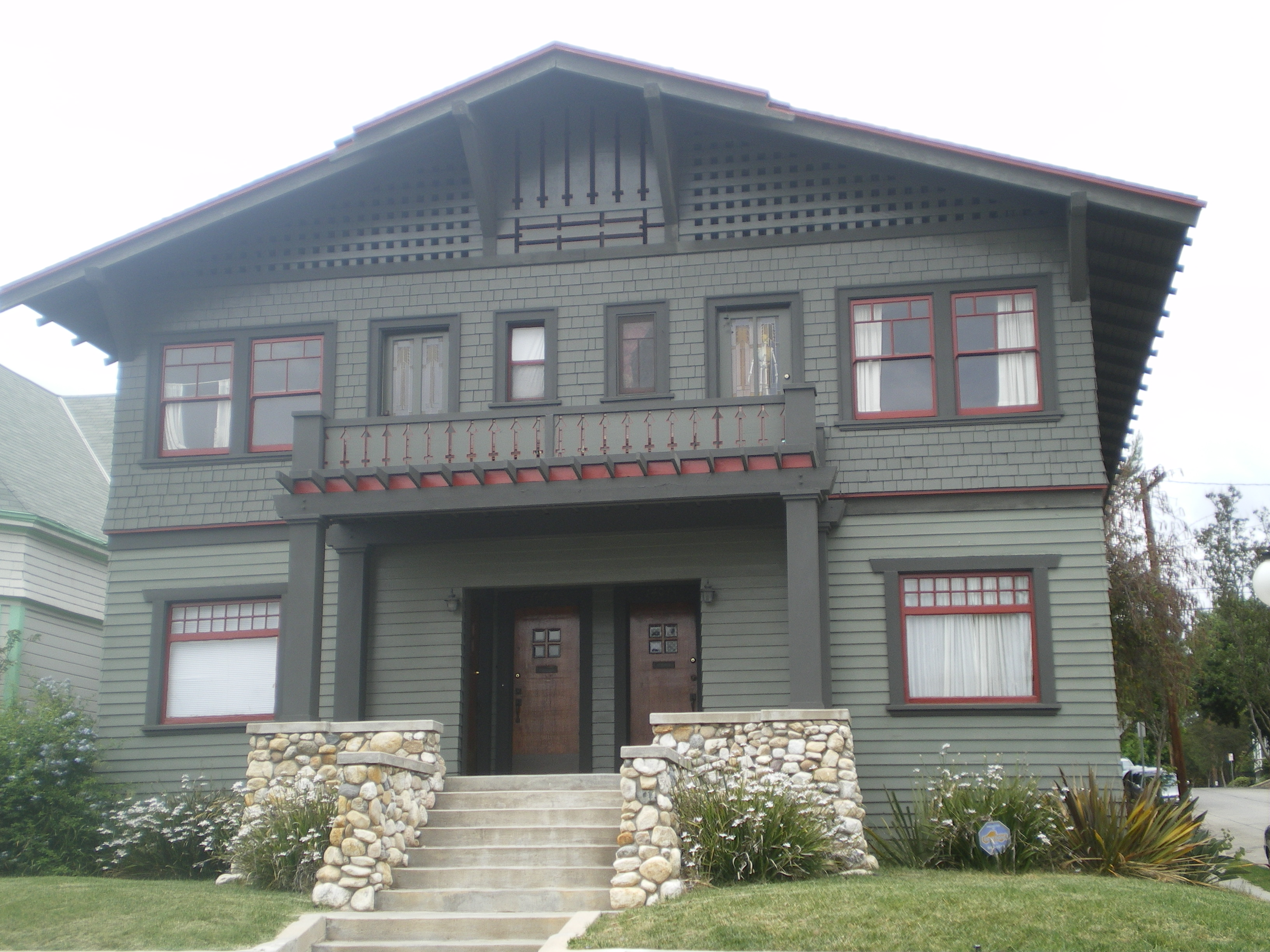
House at 1401 Carroll Ave.

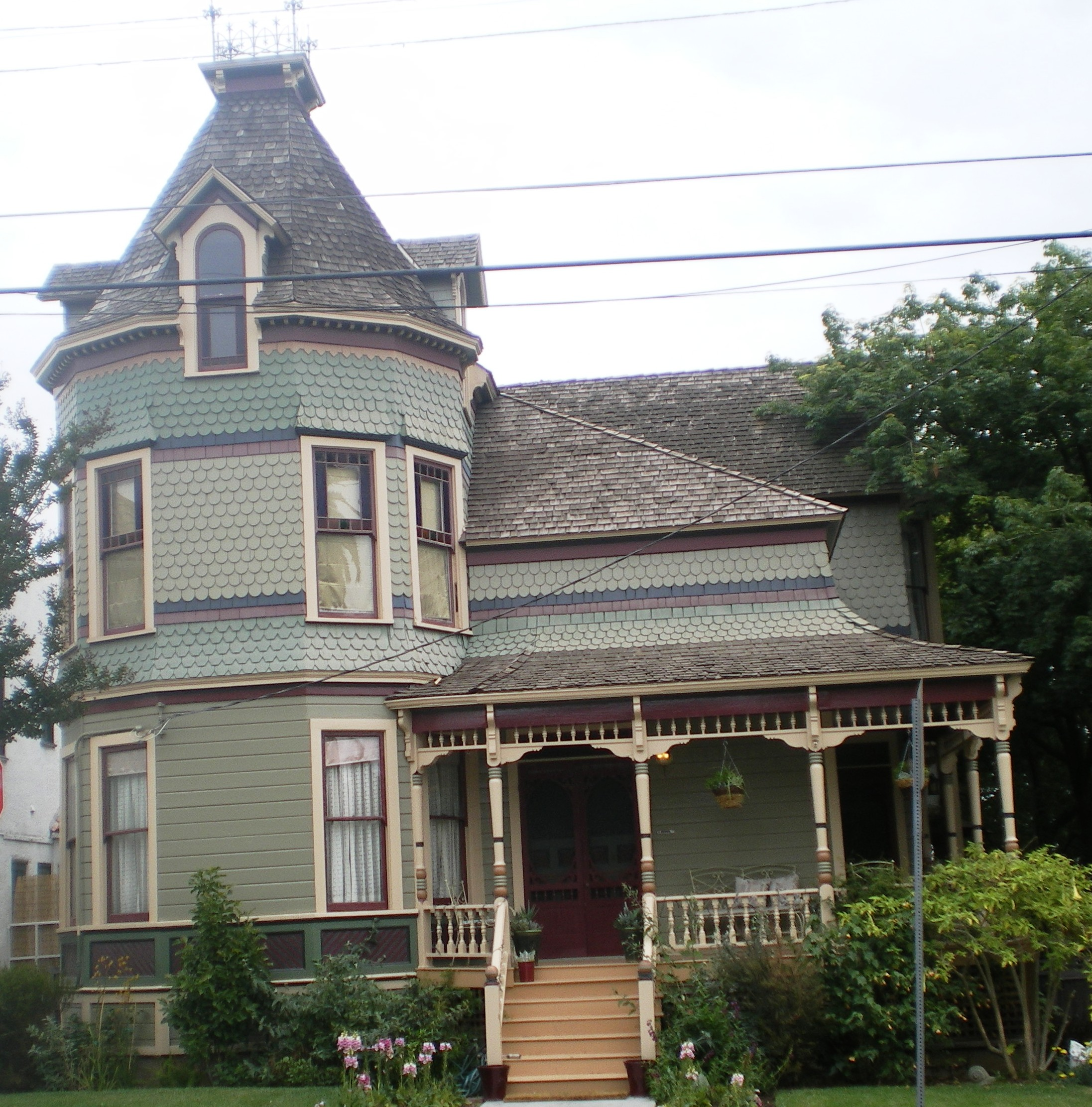
House at 724 East Edgeware (foot of Carroll Ave.)

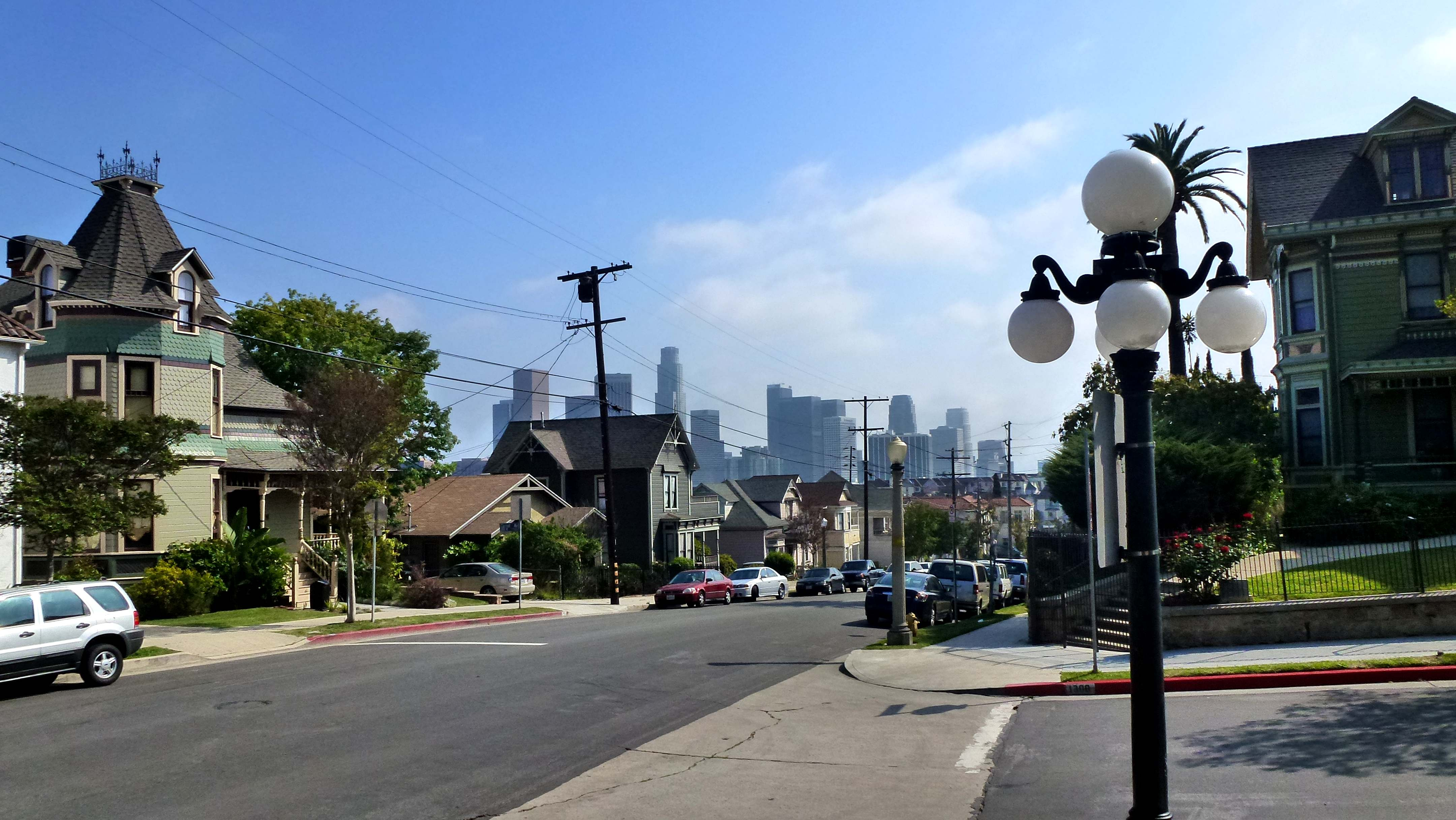
724 East Edgeware and Phillips house

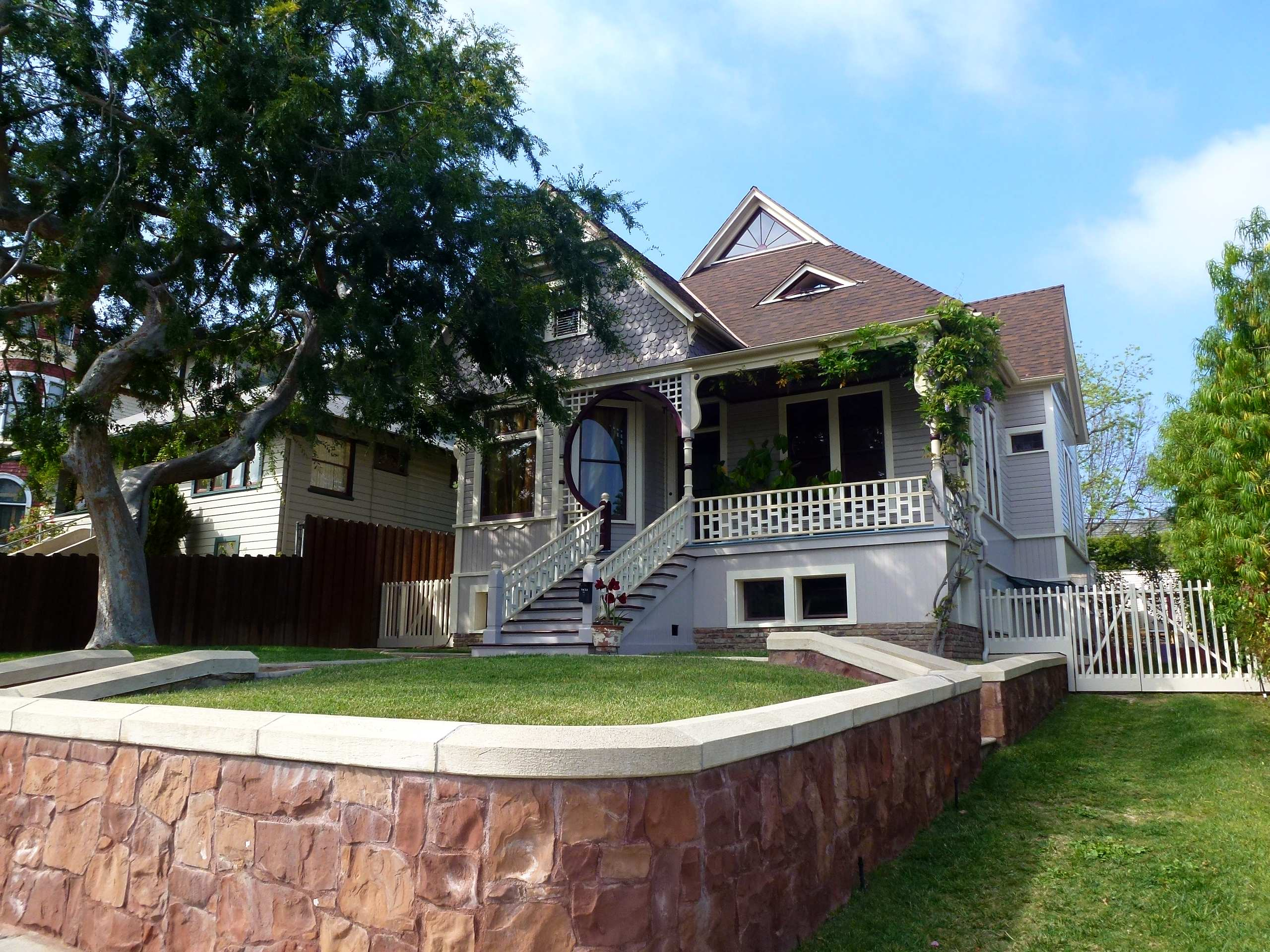
House on Carroll Avenue

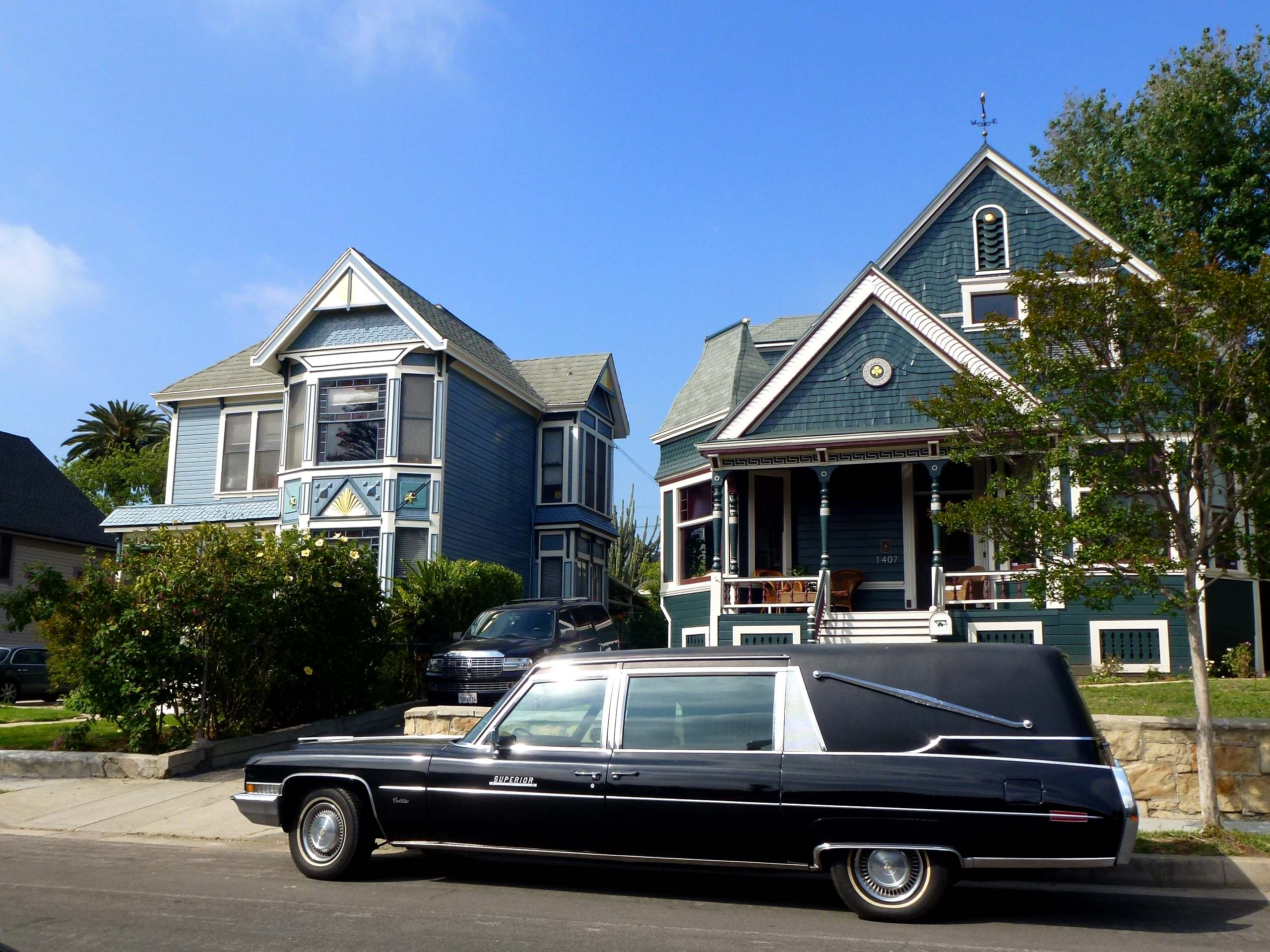
Houses on Carroll Avenue

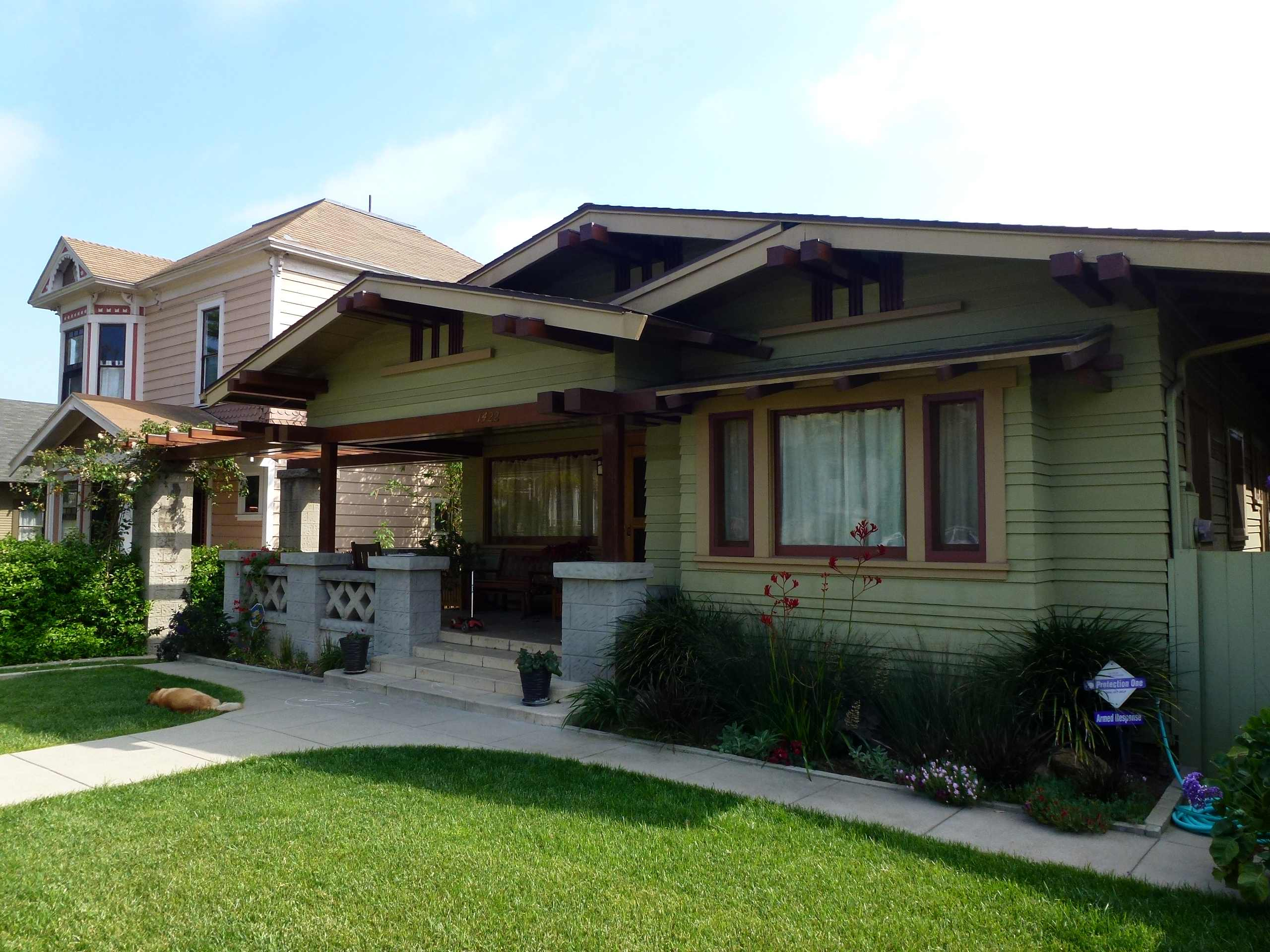
House on Carroll Avenue

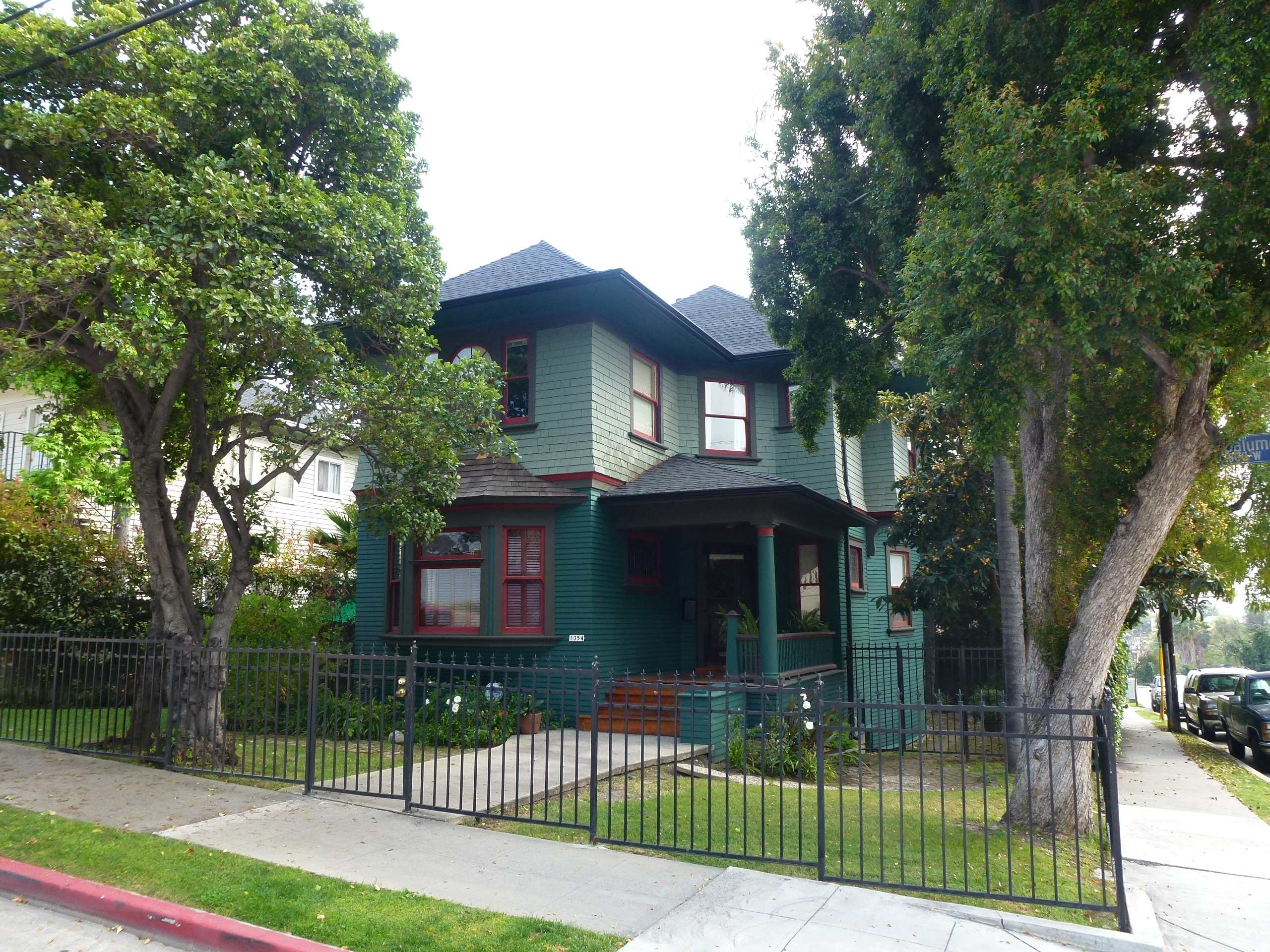
House on Angelino Heights

== See also ==
- List of Registered Historic Places in Los Angeles
- List of Los Angeles Historic-Cultural Monuments in Silver Lake, Angelino Heights, and Echo Park
