= Neutra/Maxwell House =

Coordinates: 34.0693°N 118.2523°W

- Forthmann House

- Location within the Los Angeles metropolitan area
- Location: 822 E Edgeware Rd, Angelino Heights, Los Angeles, California

History
- Built: 1941

Site notes
- Architect: Richard Neutra
- Architectural style: Mid-Century Modern

Los Angeles Historic-Cultural Monument
- Designated: July 8, 2005
- Reference no.: 808

Neutra/Maxwell House, referred to as the Maxwell House, is a Los Angeles Historic-Cultural Monument (No. 808) located in Angelino Heights, Los Angeles, California. It is a 1,200-square-foot (110 m^{2}) Mid-Century modern house built c.1941, designed by Richard Neutra. It was relocated in 2008 from its original location at 475 North Bowling Green Way in Brentwood, Los Angeles thanks to the efforts of Barbara Behm. The Charles and Sybil Maxwell House was designed and built by Neutra for the two musicians, she a violinist and he a composer, who wanted "acoustically suitable living quarters" on a budget of $6,750. Her practice room is farthest away from the composers study. There is a nice integration of sloping and flat roofs with the introduction of a glass triangle into the redwood siding. It was with this project that Neutra first experimented with the peaked roof and triangular glazed gable openings that later became a trademark of the firm when pitched roofs were mandated by city building codes. Further, this design element profoundly influenced the design of American suburban architecture in the 1950s and 60s.

== See also ==
- List of Los Angeles Historic-Cultural Monuments on the Westside
- Neutra's Maxwell house moves to Angelino Heights from Brentwood
- Extreme Makeover, the Los Angeles edition: Moving Richard Neutra
