= Mary Foy (librarian) =

American librarian (1862–1962)

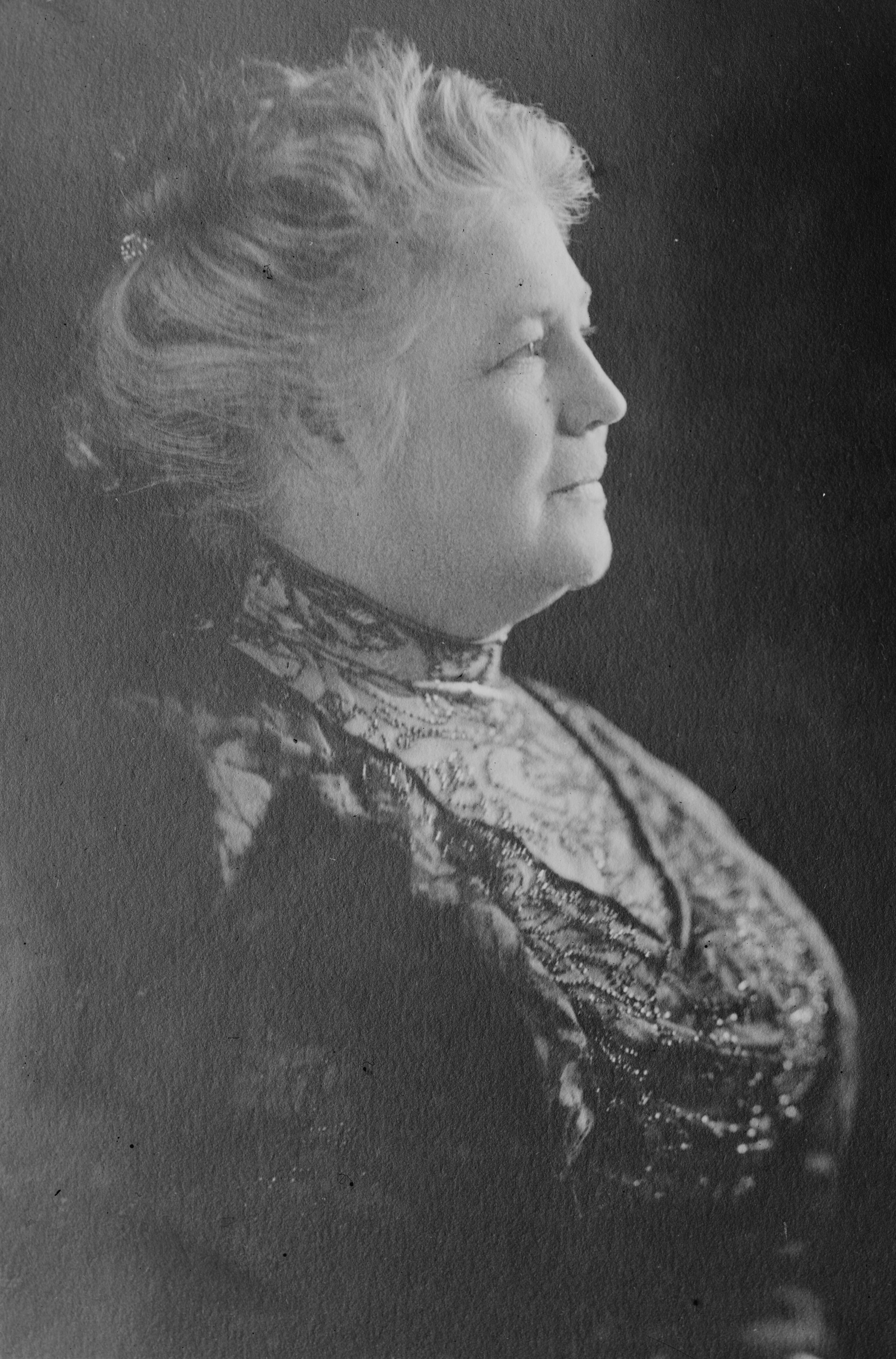
- Born: July 13, 1862; Los Angeles, California, U.S.
- Died: February 21, 1962 (aged 99)
- Education: Los Angeles High School
- Occupation: Librarian

Mary Emily Foy (July 13, 1862 – February 21, 1962) was the first woman head librarian of the Los Angeles Public Library, appointed to the job in 1880 at the age of 18. She had graduated the year before from Los Angeles High School. She served for only four years but left a legacy for Los Angeles librarians to remember.

== Early life ==
Foy was born in Los Angeles, California.

== Predecessors ==
Women played a subsidiary role in Los Angeles Public Library affairs for many years. On the library's founding in 1872, women were excluded from even using it.

However, this situation quickly changed. Within its first six months of operation, the board discussed allowing “ladys” limited membership, letting them use their male relatives’ membership cards to gain access to the library’s collections.13 In 1876 the library added a “Ladies Room” to its complex. Although the new room did not contain books, it did house a number of popular magazines as well as comfortable sofas and chairs for local clubwomen to use.

John C. Littlefield, the editor of the Los Angeles Weekly Express, was appointed the city's first librarian in 1872. Littlefield was an asthmatic and would smoke jimsonweed in his office much to the dismay of patrons. He was succeeded in 1879 by an untrained partisan appointee, Patrick Connolly, who, it was suggested, was an alcoholic who missed more than his share of days at work and was discharged by the library board, which then vowed to name a "lady librarian."

== At the Los Angeles Public Library ==
Foy, the 18-year-old daughter of merchant Samuel Foy, asked the Foys' next-door neighbor, Mayor John Toberman, for the job and he advised her to canvass all of the City Council members, which she did. She then spent the summer of 1880 in the San Francisco Bay area, working with librarians in San Francisco and Oakland to learn her trade.

She later wrote that her responsibilities on the job in the library at Main and Temple Streets in Los Angeles included:

setting up a catalogue system, keeping the library accounts, acting as hostess in the Ladies Reading Room, serving as referee for ongoing chess games in the Newspaper Room, and settling bets made in the downstairs saloon on such questions as, "Who wrote Webster’s Dictionary: Noah or Daniel?"

According to Sheri D. Irvin, in those days the appointment of women to Los Angeles city positions was often done for semi-charitable reasons such as a woman's need for financial support. When Mayor Toberman left office, a new library board was appointed and another woman appointed in Foy's place. Foy did not, however, leave quietly: She "published a valedictory in the newspaper where she criticized the [outgoing] board for its lack of involvement and interest in the library." The woman appointed to replace Foy was the daughter of L.D. Gavitt, Jessie.

The house where Mary Foy was born on July 13, 1862, and in which she lived is Los Angeles Historical Cultural Monument No. 8.

== As an educator and champion of women's rights ==
Later she taught at Alameda School in Downey and the Eighth Street School in Los Angeles and by 1903 was teaching at Los Angeles High School.

Newspaper columnist John Adams, writing in the Downey Eagle, said that Foy was a "strong-willed woman" who "campaigned for Woodrow Wilson during his national political career and fought for decades for the California Progressive Movement and Women’s Rights". She was listed in the 1913 yearbook of Los Angeles High School as a "prominent club woman and suffragist".

== Personal life ==
On February 21, 1962, Foy died. She was 99.

=== Legacy ===
Foy was honored with the establishment of the Mary Foy California Room in the new public library building at Fifth and Olive Streets, though that room was not part of the redesign of the library building when it was reconstructed after two serious fires in 1986.

Foy's tenure at the Los Angeles Central Library is chronicled in Susan Orlean's The Library Book.
