= Lipetz House =

House in Los Angeles, California

Coordinates: 34.093477°N 118.269929°W

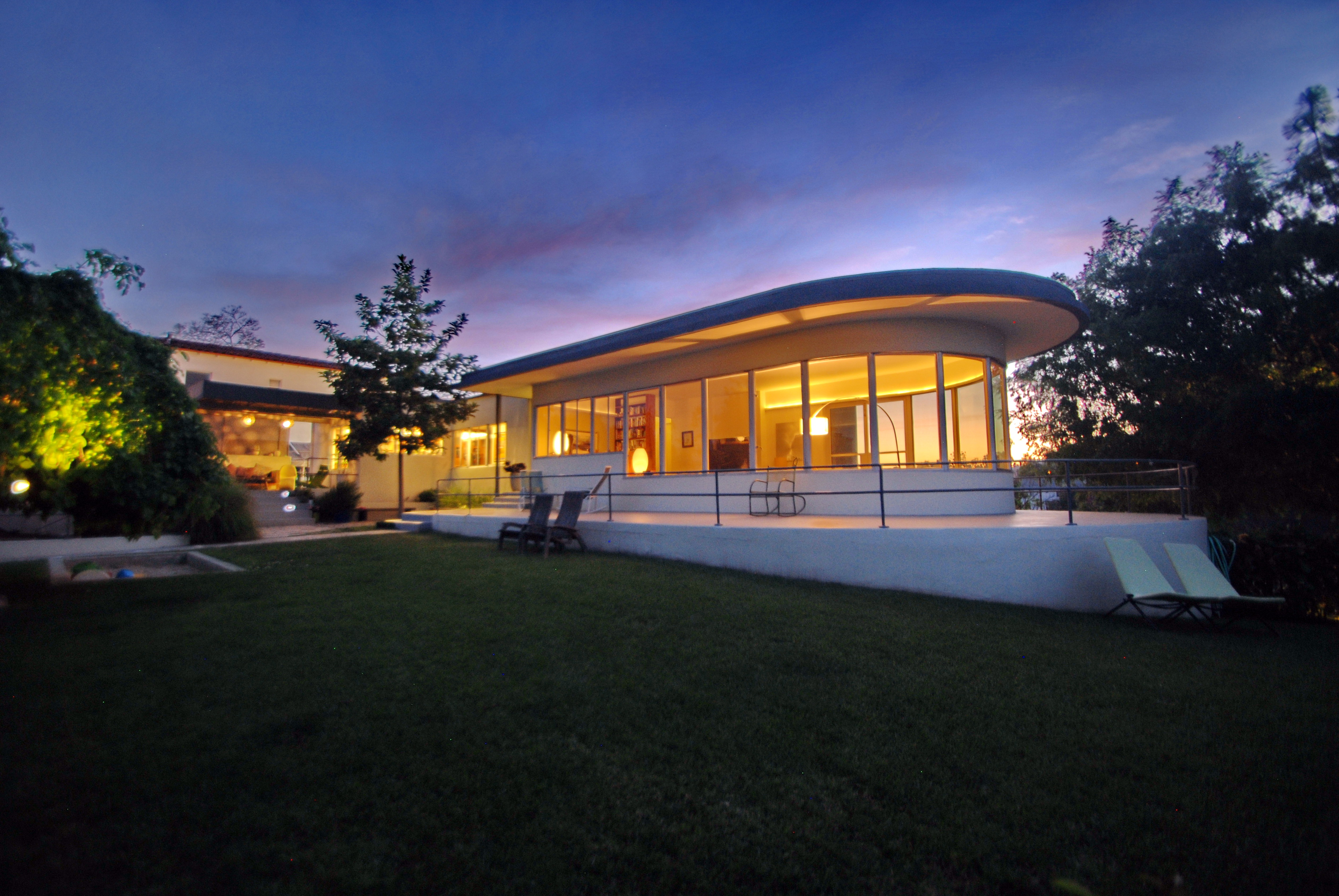

- Location within the Los Angeles metropolitan area

History
- Built: 1936

Site notes
- Architect: Raphael Soriano
- Architectural styles: Streamline Moderne and International style
- Governing body: private

Los Angeles Historic-Cultural Monument
- Designated: 2009
- Reference no.: 967

Lipetz House is a house in Los Angeles designed by Raphael Soriano, and built in 1936.

The building was Soriano's first residential commission, and arose from his knowledge and passion for both language and music. The main feature of the house was to be a music room with excellent acoustic properties that could accommodate Mrs. Lipetz’s Bechstein Grand piano and up to twenty guests. Soriano designed the north end of this 15-foot (4.6 m) x 32-foot (9.8 m) room as a semi circle with continuous windows, creating a real-life backdrop of the vast San Gabriel Mountain Range, for Lipetz's performances. The site itself is on the pinnacle of a hill overlooking Silver Lake. Several hundred music albums were accommodated in shelves placed under built-in seating areas, and much of the other furniture in the house was also built-in. The music room comprised nearly one third of the total 2,300-square-foot (210 m^{2}) area of the two-bedroom house. The design is in the International Style, built with traditional wood stud construction, similar to Richard Neutra’s frame, but with one innovate technological detail - steel beams supported the ground floor. The building was chosen as one of four U.S.A. buildings for the 1937 International Architecture Exhibition in Paris, and with it Soriano won the prestigious Prix de Rome. The house is in good condition with slight alterations.
