= Foy House =

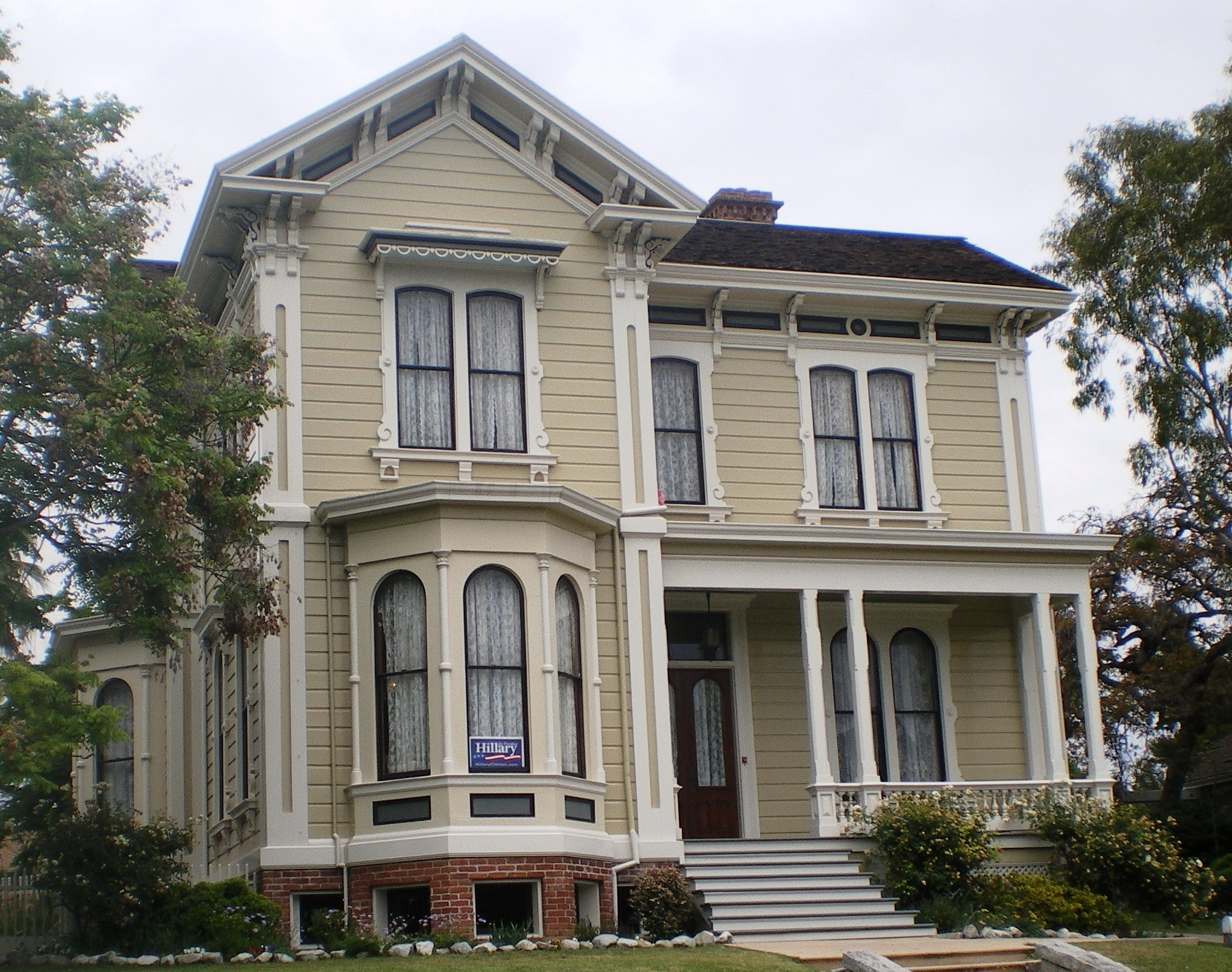
- Foy House, 2008

- Location within the Los Angeles metropolitan area
- 34°04′10.5″N 118°15′15.3″W

History
- Built: 1872, moved 1920, 1993

Site notes
- Architect: Ezra F. Kysor
- Architectural style: Italianate Victorian
- Governing body: private

Los Angeles Historic-Cultural Monument
- Designated: 1962
- Reference no.: 8

Foy House is a Victorian Italianate-style house that was built in 1872, located in Los Angeles, California. It was the eighth property in Los Angeles to receive Historical-Cultural Monument status.

== Figueroa Street ==
The original site of the house was part of the original Pueblo de Los Angeles lands at the corner of 7th Street and Figueroa Street (then known as Grasshopper Street) in Downtown Los Angeles. In 1872, Samuel Calvert Foy (September 23, 1840 – April 24, 1901) purchased the property from Los Angeles Mayor Thomas Foster for $1,000. Foy moved to Los Angeles in 1854 and operated a successful harness business at 217 Los Angeles Street, which was the oldest business establishment in the city at the time of his death. Foy also served as the city's Chief of Police for a time. He built the Foy House at the corner of Grasshopper and 7th Streets in either 1872 or 1873, and it was there that Foy and his wife, Lucinda Macy Foy, raised their son and four daughters. The house was reportedly "the first three-story building in the city." At the time the Foys built their house, the site was considered to be "way out in the country." The house's design is attributed to Ezra F. Kysor.

Foy's daughter, Mary Foy, was the city's first woman librarian from 1880 to 1884, a leader in the California Women's suffrage movement, a leader of the Democratic Party, and the first woman to be a member of one of the major parties' national committees.

Foy suffered from "dropsical trouble" during the last two years of his life and was eventually confined to the home. He died in April 1901, but his wife Lucinda Macy Foy remained in residence at the house. As the city's business district expanded rapidly in the 1910s, the 1 1/2-acre site became one of the choicest building sites in the business district, with 217 feet of frontage on Figueroa Street and 236 feet on Seventh Street.

The Wilshire Grand Hotel building was located at the building's original site from 1952 to 2012.

== Witmer Street ==
In December 1919, the Foy family sold the property for a consideration reported to be approximately $600,000. At the time of the property's sale in 1919, the new owner announced its plan to start construction immediately of a six- or seven-story structure on the site at a cost of $450,000. Though there are varying accounts as to the date (either 1906, 1918, or 1920), the Foy House was moved to its second site on 631–633 South Witmer Street, just north of Wilshire Boulevard and across from Good Samaritan Hospital.

For more than 30 years from 1951 to at least 1981, the house served as the headquarters for Magma Power Co., one of the pioneering companies in the field of geothermal energy. In September 1962, the Foy House was designated as a Los Angeles Historic-Cultural Monument (HCM #8), only the eighth property to receive the designation. In 1974, Magma Power restored the house at a cost of $50,000, using the services of four-time Oscar-winning set designer, F. Keogh Gleason, for the interior renovation. In 1981, About 10 of Magma's employees worked at Foy House.

In the early 1980s, the house was donated to Good Samaritan Hospital by businessman Ben Weingart.

== Carroll Avenue ==
The house had fallen into disrepair by the early 1990s. In 1992, the Good Samaritan Hospital reached an agreement with James Prager, an attorney who owned a Victorian home in the Carroll Avenue historic district in Angelino Heights. The hospital agreed to contribute to the move of the house, and Prager agreed to restore the home. In December 1992, the house was moved to its third location at 1337 Carroll Avenue. The Foy House was the seventh house to be moved to Angelino Heights, the first and largest historic preservation zone in the City of Los Angeles. From 1998 through 2006 it was highlighted in several episodes of the television series Charmed. In 2011, it was used as the exterior of J Edgar Hoover's parents home in the movie "J. Edgar". In 2012, it was featured in the movie Guilt Trip, as Andy Margolis Jr.'s house.

== See also ==
- List of Los Angeles Historic-Cultural Monuments in Downtown Los Angeles
