= Angelino Heights, Los Angeles =

Angelino Heights Angeleno Heights
- Neighborhood of Los Angeles
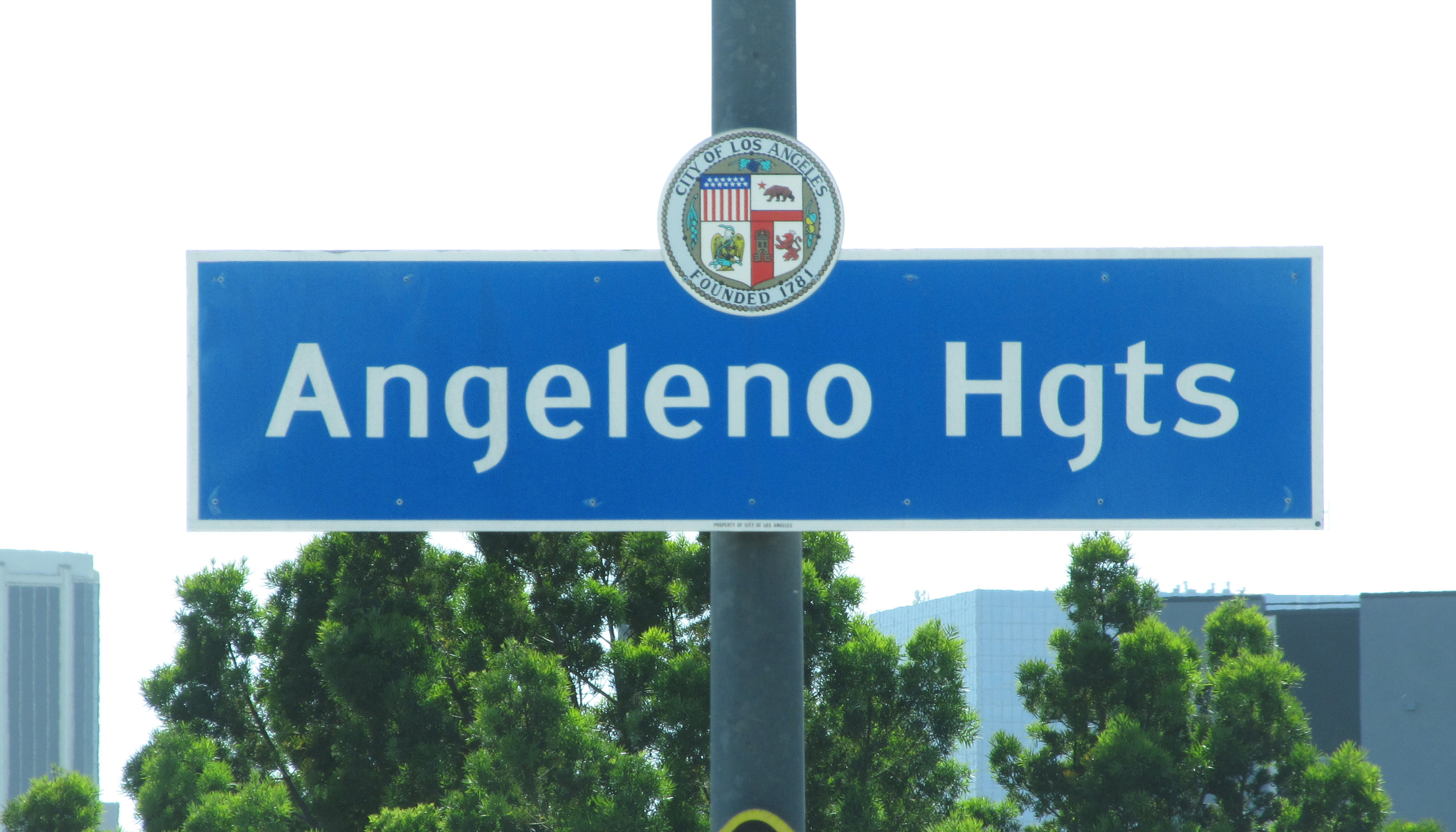
- Angeleno Heights neighborhood sign located on Beaudry Avenue south of Sunset Boulevard

- Location in Los Angeles
- Coordinates: 34°04′13″N 118°15′17″W
- Country: United States
- State: California
- County: Los Angeles County
- City: Los Angeles
- Elevation: 502 ft (153 m)

Angeleno Heights is one of the oldest neighborhoods in Los Angeles. Situated between neighboring Chinatown and Echo Park, the neighborhood is known for its concentration of eclectic architectural styles from three eras: Victorian, Turn of the Century and Revival. Carroll Avenue is listed on the National Register of Historic Places and there are over thirty Historic-Cultural Monuments in the neighborhood.

== History ==
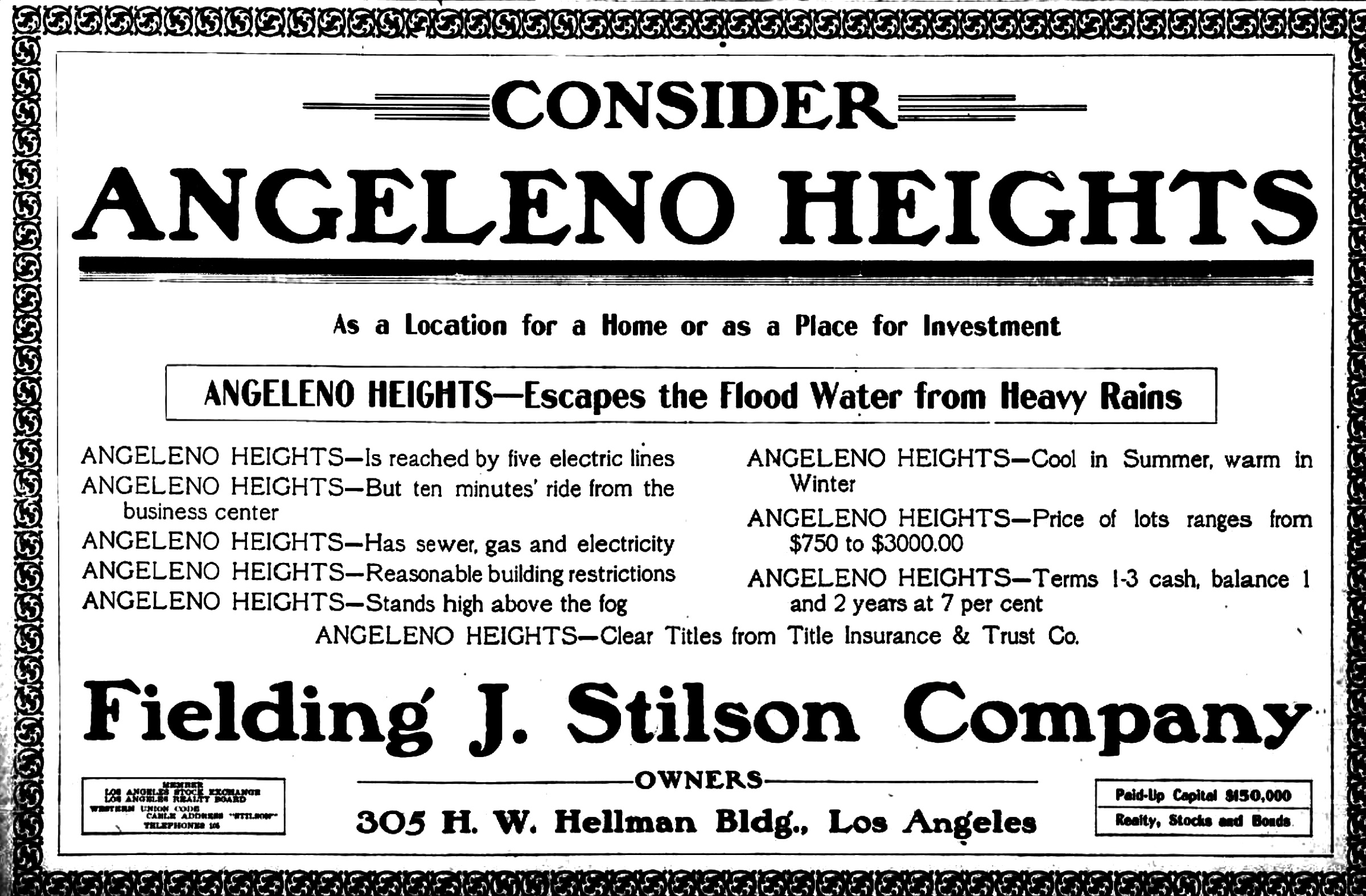
Newspaper advertisement, March 28, 1906

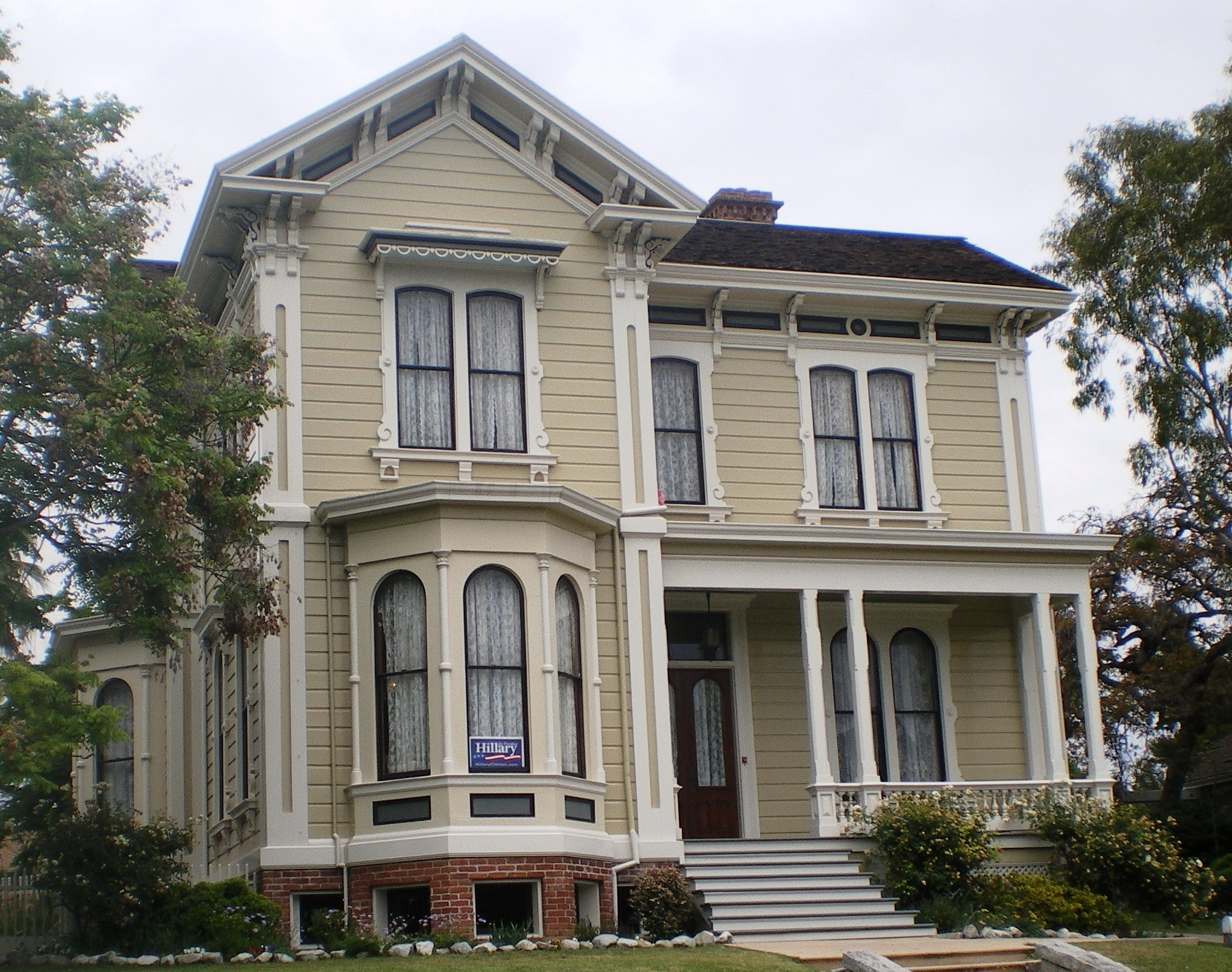
Built in 1872, The Foy House, 1335-13411/2 Carroll Ave., was designated historic-cultural monument #8

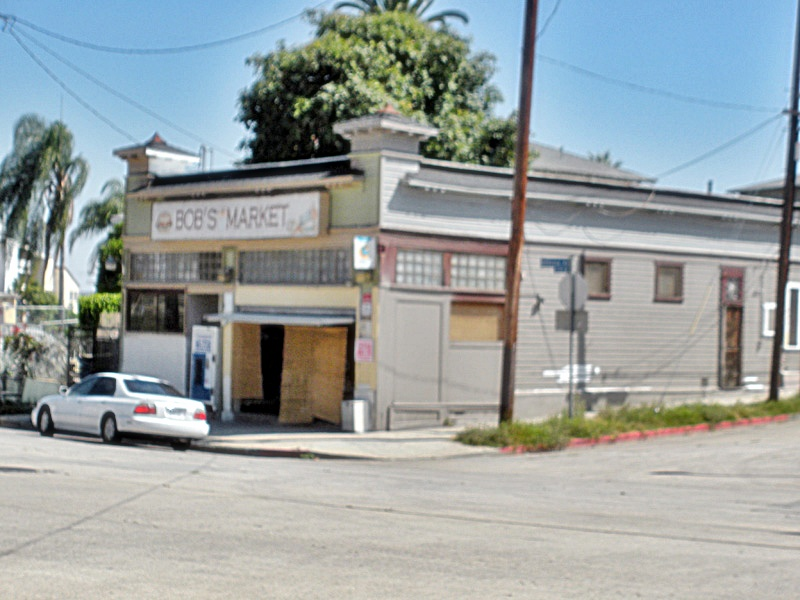
Bob's Market, built in 1910, was designated historic-cultural monument #215.

Angeleno Heights is second only to Bunker Hill as the oldest district in Los Angeles outside of Downtown. Founded in 1886, it was originally connected to the downtown mainline (which ran east to west on Temple Street) by the Temple Street Cable Railway and later by streetcars. It is known for its steep hills. The district contains many notable examples of Victorian architecture, particularly of the Eastlake and Queen Anne styles, and though found throughout the neighborhood, they are especially concentrated on Carroll Avenue. Traveling around the neighborhood, one also discovers that many other styles of architecturally significant homes are to be found here, such as Craftsman, Bungalow, Mission Revival, Art Deco, and Colonial Revival, to name a few.

A large swath of Angeleno Heights was destroyed to build the Hollywood Freeway, which cut it off from Temple Street save for an overpass at Edgeware Road.

Angeleno Heights was the City of Los Angeles' first recognized historic district. The Angeleno Heights Historic Preservation Overlay Zone (HPOZ) was enacted in 1981 and prohibits unsympathetic remodeling of historic houses and requires new construction to resemble original architecture in scale, massing and materials.

== Geography ==
Angeleno Height's boundaries include the Hollywood Freeway to the south, Sunset Boulevard to the north and east, and Echo Park Lake to the west. Sunset Boulevard is the main thoroughfare. Angelino Heights is situated on a hill of about 502 feet in elevation.

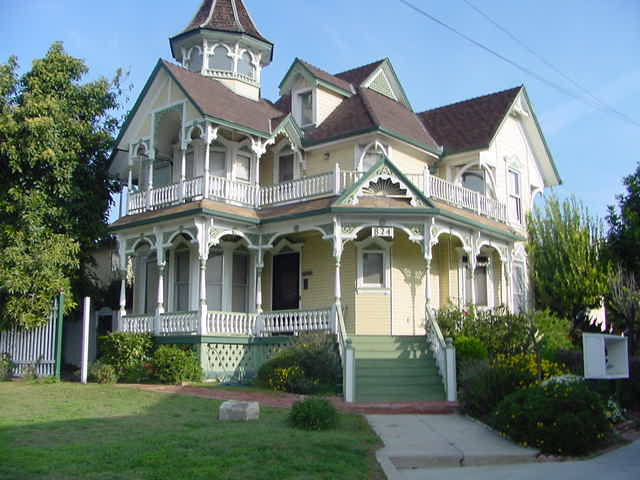
Built in 1892, the house at 824 East Kensington Road was designated as Los Angeles Historic-Cultural Monument #223.

== Police service ==
The neighborhood is served by the Los Angeles Police Department's Rampart Community Police Station located at 1401 West 6th Street.

== Education ==
Angelino Heights is zoned to Los Angeles USD schools.

For elementary school, residents are zoned to either Plasencia Elementary School or Logan Elementary. For middle school, residents are zoned to either King Middle School or Virgil Middle School. For high school, all residents are zoned to Belmont High School.

== National Register and Historic-Cultural Monuments ==
The 1300 block of Carroll Avenue (between Edgeware and Douglas Streets) is listed in the National Register of Historic Places. It contains the highest concentration of 19th century Victorian homes in Los Angeles. Additionally, there are over 30 homes in Angeleno Heights that have been designated as Historic-Cultural Monuments.

== In media ==
- 1324 Carroll Avenue - Grandma Lilly’s home in Grandma's Boy.
- 1329 Carroll Avenue - appeared in the TV series Charmed and the films Deuce Bigalow: Male Gigolo and Earthquake.
- 1345 Carroll Avenue - the setting for Michael Jackson's Thriller music video. The 3,532-square-foot Queen Anne style house was originally built for a local warehouse operator named Michael Sanders in 1887. The Sanders House was also featured in a Season 4 episode of Charmed, as well as the movie Teen Witch.
- Our Neighborhoods with Huell Howser - the neighborhood was profiled in 2002.
- 722 E Kensington Rd - Dominic Toretto's house in the Fast and Furious series.
