= Raphael Soriano =

Architect and educator (1904–1988)

Raphael S. Soriano
- Born: August 1, 1904; Rhodes, Greece
- Died: July 21, 1988 (aged 83); Claremont, California
- Education: University of Southern California
- Occupation: Architect
- Awards: AIA Distinguished Achievement Award (1986); USC Distinguished Alumni Award (1986)
- Buildings: Lipetz House; Shulman House; Polito House; Gogol House; Case Study House 1950; Colby Apartments; Eichler House; Adolph's Laboratory and Office; Schrage House; Koosis House; Soto-Michigan Jewish Community Center
- Projects: Plywood House; All Aluminum Homes; Soria Structures; World Peace Island Alcatraz

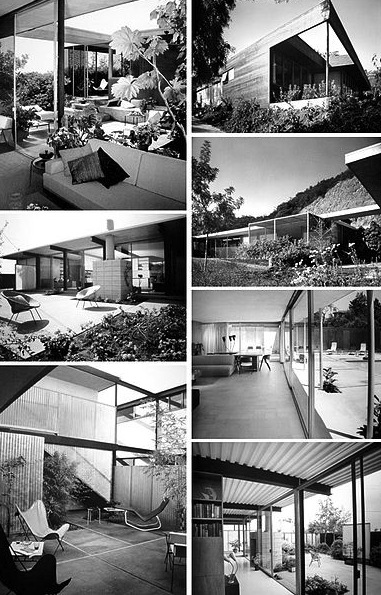

Raphael S. Soriano, FAIA, (August 1, 1904 – July 21, 1988) was a Greek-born American architect and educator, who helped define a period of 20th-century architecture that came to be known as Mid-century modern. He pioneered the use of modular prefabricated steel and aluminum structures in residential and commercial design and construction.

== Biography ==
Born in Rhodes, Greece to a Sephardic Jewish family, Soriano attended the College Saint-Jean-Baptiste, Rhodes, before emigrating to the United States in 1924. After settling with relatives in Los Angeles, he enrolled in the University of Southern California's School of Architecture in 1929, graduating in 1934. In 1930, he became an American citizen and, the following year, secured an internship at the practice of Richard Neutra, working alongside fellow interns Gregory Ain and Harwell Hamilton Harris. A brief internship with Rudolph Schindler in 1934 followed, but Soriano quickly returned to his unpaid position at Neutra's office.

With America in the throes of the Great Depression, Soriano managed to find work upon graduation with the County of Los Angeles on several WPA projects, such as the famous "Steel Lobster", and in a local architect's office. By 1936, he had completed his first commission, the Lipetz House, which appeared in the 1937 International Architectural Exhibition in Paris.

With residential and commercial construction in the U.S. stalled by the country's involvement in World War II, Soriano took up lecturing at USC and began contributing proposals for post-war housing designs to various competitions and publications. Of these, Soriano's "Plywood House" prototype received Third Prize in 1943 in the Postwar Living Competition, sponsored by Arts & Architecture magazine. Once the war ended, Soriano had no trouble securing commissions, now garnering prizes for his built projects, such as the Katz House, in Studio City, a 1949 recipient of the American Institute of Architects (AIA) Southern California Chapter Three Award. The following year, the architect completed a home for a friend, renowned architectural photographer Julius Shulman, one of the few Soriano structures still standing. The Shulman residence and 1964 Grossman House were the last two occupied by their original owners.

Invited by John Entenza of Arts & Architecture magazine to participate in the Case Study Houses program, Soriano completed his project in 1950. Pioneering in its use of steel in residential construction, the design marks a turning point for the program, later culminating in Pierre Koenig' s Case Study House #21 and #22. Soriano's Colby Apartments of 1951 — distinct not only for their modern design, but also for their extensive use of steel — received the National American Institute of Architects Award for Design, the VII International Pan American Congress Award, and the AIA Southern California Chapter One Honor Award.

In 1953, Soriano moved from Los Angeles to Tiburon, in Marin County, across the bay north of San Francisco, where he lived with his wife Elizabeth Stephens (Betty) and her two daughters, Margaret and Lucille Coberly. By 1955, Soriano had designed the first mass-produced steel house, which developer Joseph Eichler build in Palo Alto. His work with Eichler would garner two awards from the Northern California Chapter of the AIA.

Soriano was made a Fellow by the American Institute of Architects (FAIA) in 1961. In 1965, he launched Soria Structures, Inc. to design and build prefabricated houses, marketed as "All-Aluminum Homes." His last realized designs were eleven All-Aluminum Homes on the island of Maui, Hawaii, built in 1965.

From 1970 until his death, in 1988, Soriano focused on traveling the world as an architectural lecturer, writer, and researcher. He was recognized by the AIA with a Distinguished Achievement Award and by USC with a Distinguished Alumni Award, both in 1986. Shortly before his death he served as a Special Sessions Instructor at the College of Environmental Design at Cal Poly Pomona.

== Works ==
Of the 50 buildings Soriano built, only 12 remain; the others have succumbed to wildfire, earthquake, or demolition. Among the survivors, a number endured unsympathetic make-overs and additions. Those still intact and unmolested are now protected by municipal preservation codes. A collection of Soriano papers resides at the College of Environmental Design Special Collections at the California State Polytechnic University, Pomona (Cal Poly Pomona).
