= Atherwood =

Atherwood Eichler Subdivision
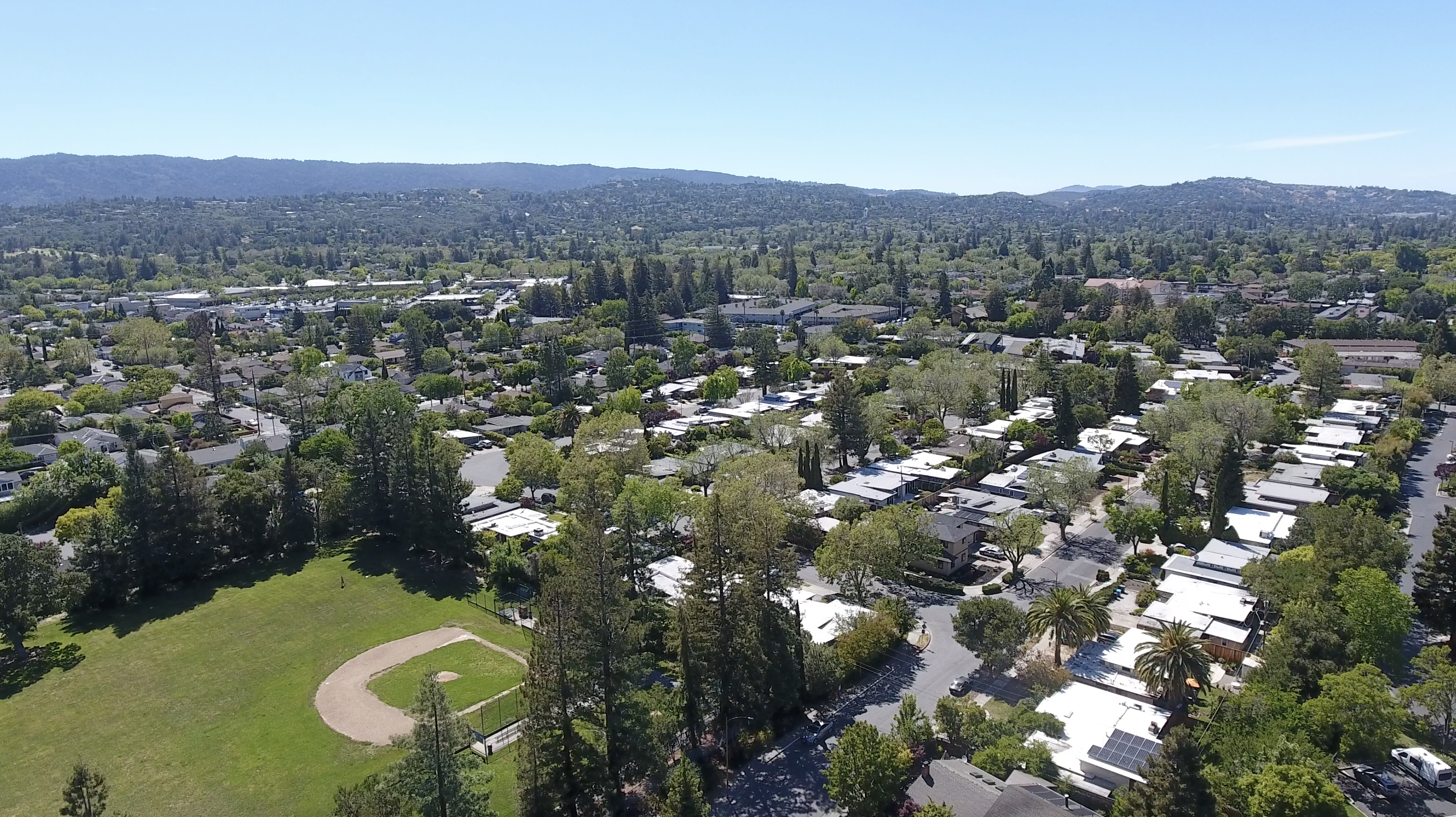
- Aerial Photograph of Atherwood, May 2022

Project
- Completed: November 1950
- Developer: Eichler Homes
- Architect: Anshen and Allen

Physical features
- Major buildings: 64

Location
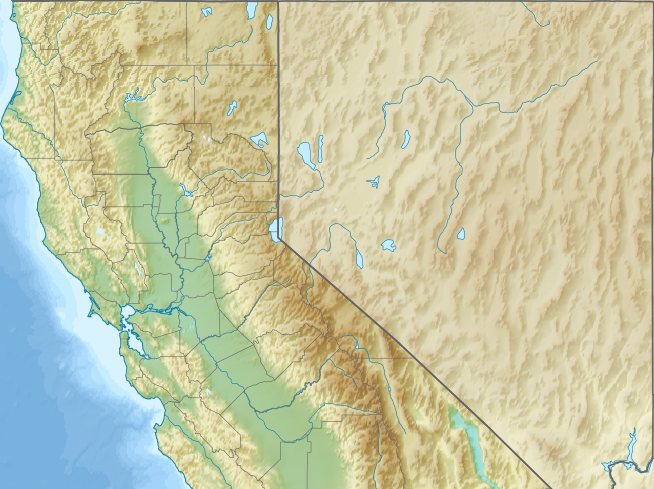
- Coordinates: 37.460720°N 122.224254°W
- Country: US
- State: California
- County: San Mateo County
- City: Redwood City

Atherwood is a subdivision in Redwood City, California, that was built in 1950 by housing developer Joseph Eichler. It was one of Eichler's first developments working with an architect and his first major subdivision in San Mateo County. It consists of 64 original single family homes designed by architectural firm Anshen and Allen based on their AA-1 design. The Atherwood subdivision is accessed by Atherwood Avenue off of SR-84 and is located at the border of Atherton and Redwood City.

== Name ==
The name is a portmanteau from combining parts of Atherton and Redwood City since the subdivision is located on the border of the two cities. The only other use of this name is for an elementary school within the Simi Valley Unified School District.

== Butterfly roofs ==
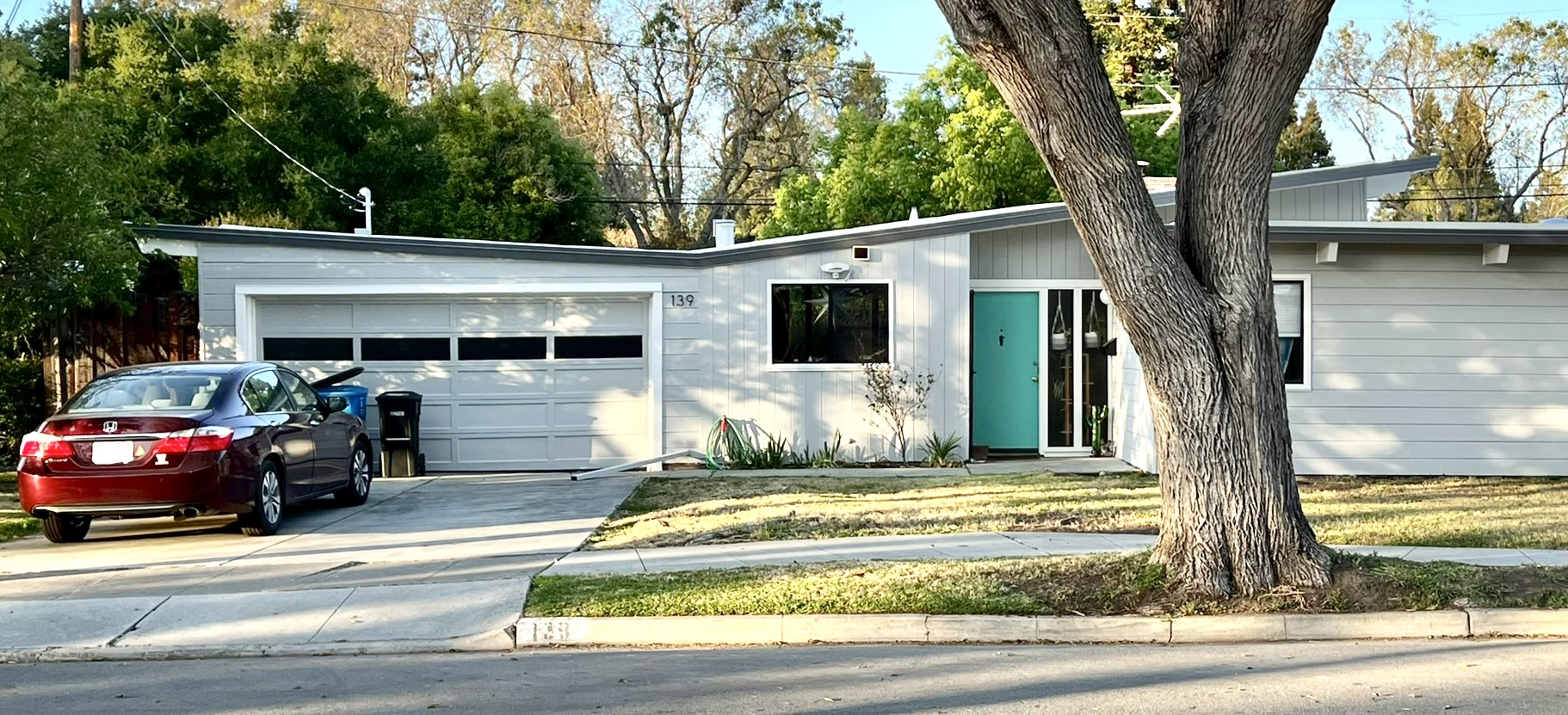
A house with a butterfly roof in the Atherwood subdivision.

The Atherwood subdivision is significant because it is the only architect-designed Eichler subdivision containing butterfly style roofs. While not exclusively featuring this style of roof, Atherwood contains 10 houses with butterfly roofs, it represents a critical number and should be considered as the first housing tract in California to feature this roof style. Often, William Krisel is credited for popularizing the butterfly roof in mid-century modern housing tracts with the 1957 Twin Palms tract (16 with butterfly roofs out of 66 houses total), however Atherwood predates this tract by seven years.

== Awards ==
Atherwood was noted as "Subdivision of the Year" by Architectural Forum in December 1950.
