= X-100 (house) =

- U.S. National Register of Historic Places
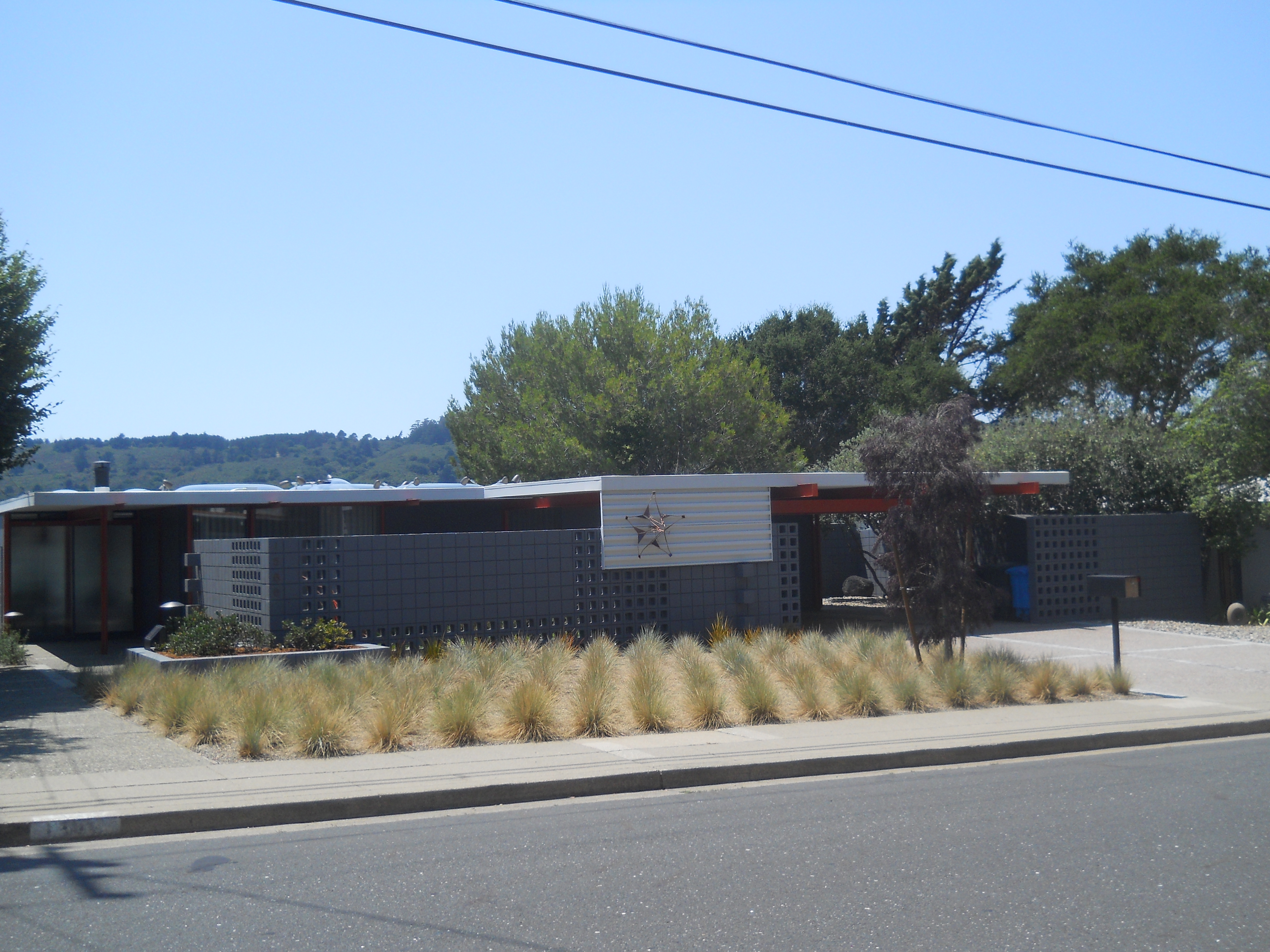
- Location: 1586 Lexington Avenue, San Mateo, CA 94402
- Coordinates: 37.525053°N 122.353416°W
- Built: 1956
- Architect: A. Quincy Jones with Frederick Emmons
- Architectural style: Midcentury Modern
- Website: www.eichlerx-100.com
- NRHP reference No.: 16000381
- Added to NRHP: June 20, 2016

The X-100 is an experimental steel house designed by A. Quincy Jones with his partner Frederick Emmons for Eichler Homes and built in 1956 at the San Mateo Highlands development in California. It was listed on the National Register of Historic Places in 2016.

== Background and construction ==
Eichler Homes was founded as a developer of tracts of single-family houses in the Bay Area suburbs during the California building boom that followed World War II. Joseph Eichler, the founder, insisted on modernist style and used only designs by architects, initially Anshen and Allen and later also Jones and Emmons. The company specialized in constructing these houses cheaply enough to be an affordable alternative to more conventional tract houses. The vast majority were of timber, using post and beam construction. Eichler had however commissioned a steel-frame house from Raphael Soriano in 1955; this was built in Palo Alto to demonstrate the practicality and cost-worthiness of building tract houses in steel rather than wood, was smaller than the X-100, and came in at a cost of $7 per square foot, according to Eichler comparable to that of a timber house. Jones had also designed a steel-frame house for the "Research Village" project sponsored by U.S. Gypsum in Barrington, Illinois, and another in 1954 as his personal residence in Crestwood Hills, Los Angeles (destroyed in the 1961 Bel Air Fire).

Eichler commissioned the X-100 from Jones in 1955, with two aims: further exploration of the practicality of steel for future homes, also showcasing advanced household appliances, some of them prototypes; and promotion of the San Mateo Highlands development, whose location was at the time remote from highways. Its name may have been derived from the X-15, a crewed space project. Ground was broken in May 1956 and the grand opening took place on October 6. The house structure was pre-fabricated, with advice from Pierre Koenig, like Soriano a Los Angeles architect with considerable experience building in steel.

== House ==
The house has three bedrooms, two living rooms, and a kitchen grouped around the perimeter, with a central utility core containing two bathrooms and utility and laundry areas. Instead of the open atrium of many Eichler houses of the period, it has two interior gardens, dubbed the "entry garden" and the "game garden" by the company; there is also a children's play yard, which the two smaller bedrooms open onto, while the master bedroom has glass doors to the backyard. The landscaping was by Douglas Baylis. The thin steel supports and use of glass sliding doors both inside and along the entire rear facade create a sense of openness; the inside entrance to the master bedroom has curtains rather than a door. The house is on a ridge with views of the Coastal Range across open space preserved as watershed and a nature reserve; originally it was possible to see through the house to the hills from the street, which garden walls and gates now prevent.

The structure consists of six bents, of which the three at the carport end are longer, of 4-inch H-section columns approximately 13 feet apart supporting 8-inch I-beams. (U.S. Steel indicated in an ad that 16-inch beams would have been necessary if wood had been used.) The beams protrude under the roof at the front of the house; Jones turned down the steel decking to form a fascia. The roof was originally covered with tar and gravel, later replaced with sprayed polyurethane foam. In the gardens, the floor consists of circular concrete "steppingstones" of various diameters between 18 inches and nine and a half feet, plus some in the entry garden made up of sections of circles to make cloudlike forms. Each garden has three planting areas where bare earth was left between the circles. The house's underfloor heating system extended to the garden pads. The beams and columns are painted deep brownish red ("deep-tone cinnamon") and the corrugated metal ceiling light grey. For privacy, the side walls have panels of the high-density plywood used for concrete forms. At the front of the house, concrete blocks painted in a coffee color are used for the facade, the wall of the play area, and planters; these are mostly half blocks, with both blocks turned sideways and full blocks forming a decorative pattern.

Inside, in addition to track lighting on both sides, the X-100 has plastic skylights ("skydomes") in each room that are equipped with artificial lighting; one above the gardens and bathrooms is 32 feet long in four sections. It made extensive use of Formica in white, grey, charcoal, and primrose yellow, including reversible white and yellow panels on the kitchen cabinets. Modern and prototype equipment in addition to the underfloor heating (standard in Eichler houses) included a black dishwasher said to incorporate five years of research, a "pulverator" (garbage disposal), a double oven with "vari-speed control" and attached to a liquor storage cabinet, a refrigerator-freezer, a washer-dryer, a water heater, a radio and intercom over the kitchen counter, a built-in five-function blender, and a two-burner cooktop for warming food between the two sliding sections of the built-in dining table. There are dual bathtub controls, for use when showering and when bathing. Originally the house had a rotating fireplace in the entry garden and interior decor by Knorr and Associates, furniture by Herman Miller, and accessories by Gump's. Total cost was $125,000. A metal star sculpture that remains on the facade is probably by Matt Kahn, an artist who worked with Eichler.

== Later history ==
On display for three months as the "house of tomorrow", the X-100 was visited by 150,000 people, written about in publications including Popular Science, Life, Sunset, Arts & Architecture, and Living for Young Homemakers, and covered in a newsreel. Eichler sold it for $60,000 to Jesper Petersen, a furniture importer; his secretary Anna-Lise Pedersen bought it in 1964 and lived there until her death in 2003. It was then bought by a group named X-100 Partners; one of them, Marty Arbunich, director of the Eichler Network, restored it and became the sole owner in 2013. The house was added to the National Register of Historic Places in June 2016. In 2018 it was made available for rent.
