= Hobee's Restaurant =

American restaurant chain

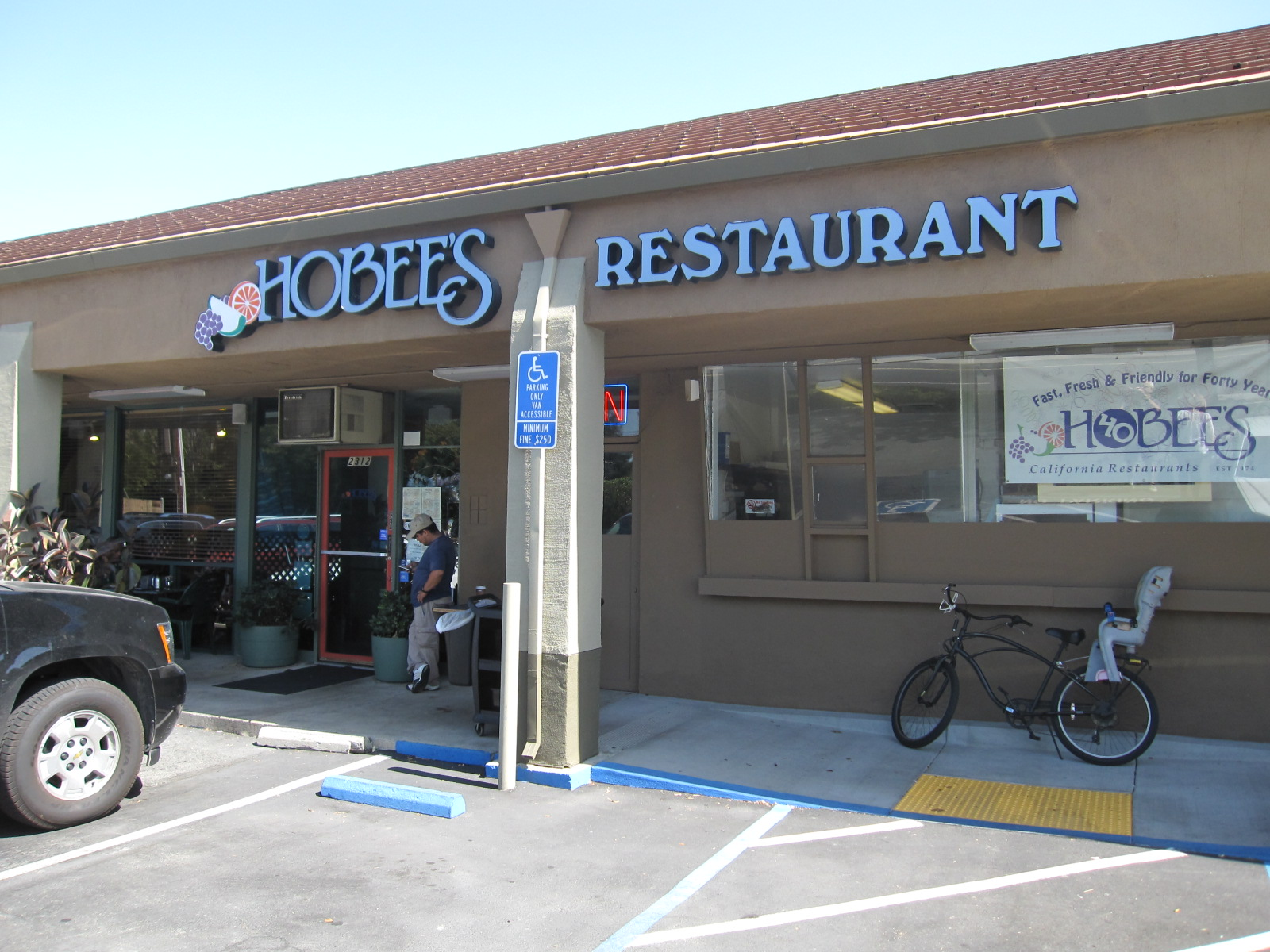
- Hobee's Restaurant in Mountain View (2014)

Restaurant information
- Food type: American breakfast, lunch

Hobee's Restaurant is a chain of sit-down restaurants in San Mateo and Santa Clara counties in Northern California, founded in 1974 by Paul Taber.

== History ==
In 1974, Paul Taber, bought the Dairy Belle restaurant located in the Monta Loma neighborhood of Mountain View, California, and opened the first Hobee's Restaurant. A sometime-vegetarian and animal welfarist, Taber gradually moved the menu away from traditional diner fare Dairy Belle had offered to more alternative options, including tofu, eggs from local farms, freshly baked blueberry coffeecake, and a cinnamon-orange house tea which has become its trademark beverage.

By 2009, Hobee's had grown to twelve locations and grossed over $12 million annually. As of 2024, Hobee's has three operative sites throughout the San Francisco Bay Area, in the Peninsula and South Bay. Historically when a location of Hobee's was closed, their employee's jobs would be transferred to other Hobee's locations so nobody missed work hours.

Hobee's regularly wins the best breakfast and best brunch awards from various Silicon Valley newspapers. In May 2006, Hobee's was named "Best Breakfast/Brunch in Silicon Valley" by The Mercury News.

== Locations ==
=== Current locations ===
- El Camino Real, Palo Alto, California
- Belmont, California
- Sunnyvale, California
- San Jose, California

=== Past locations ===
- Central Expressway and Rengstorff Avenue, Monta Loma, Mountain View, California
- San Jose, California
- Cupertino, California
- San Bruno, California
- San Luis Obispo, California
- Town and Country Shopping Center, El Camino Real at Embarcadero Road, Palo Alto, California
- Fremont, California
- Santa Cruz, California
