= Butterfly roof =

Type of roof

Butterfly roof form

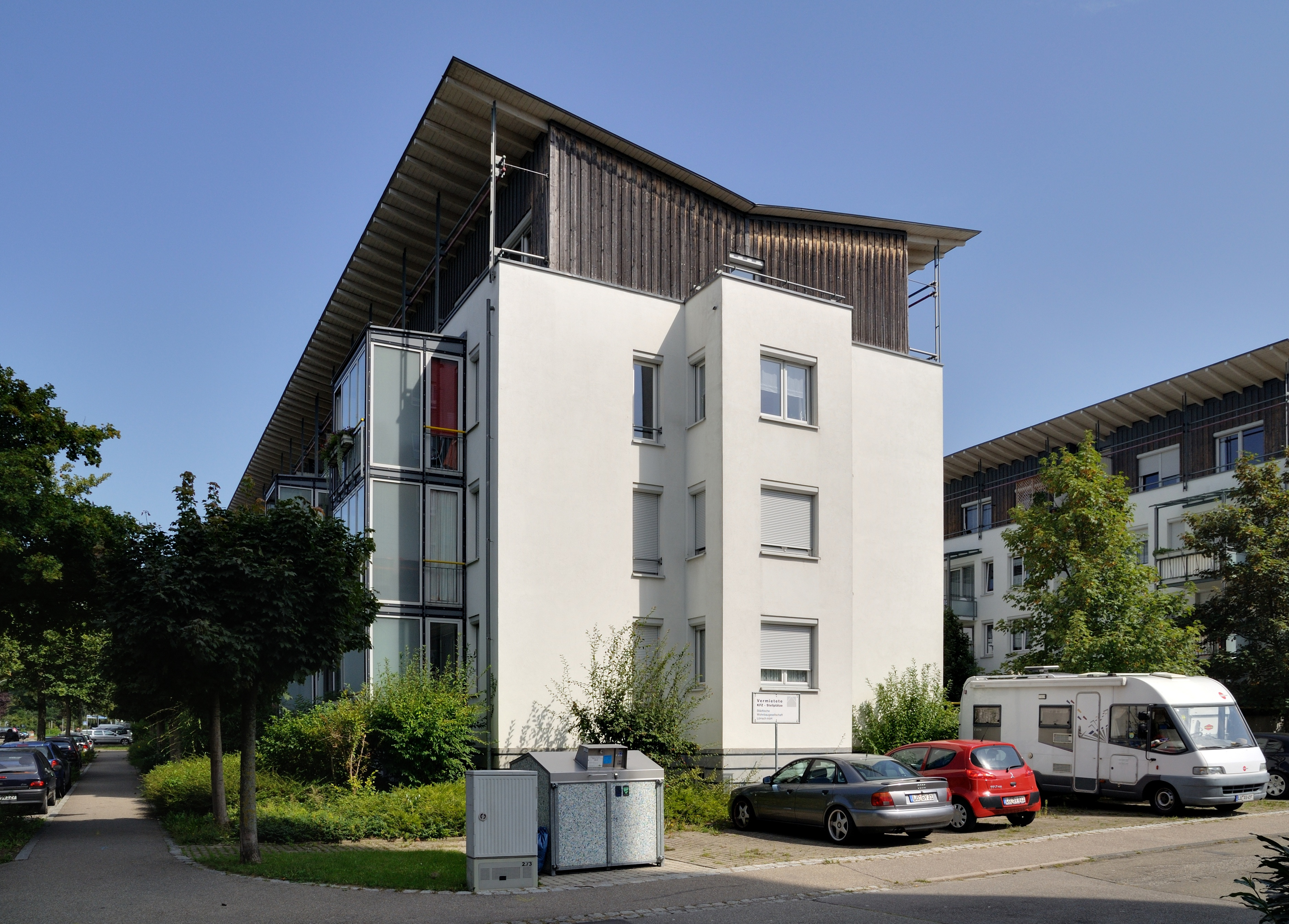
Butterfly roof in Germany

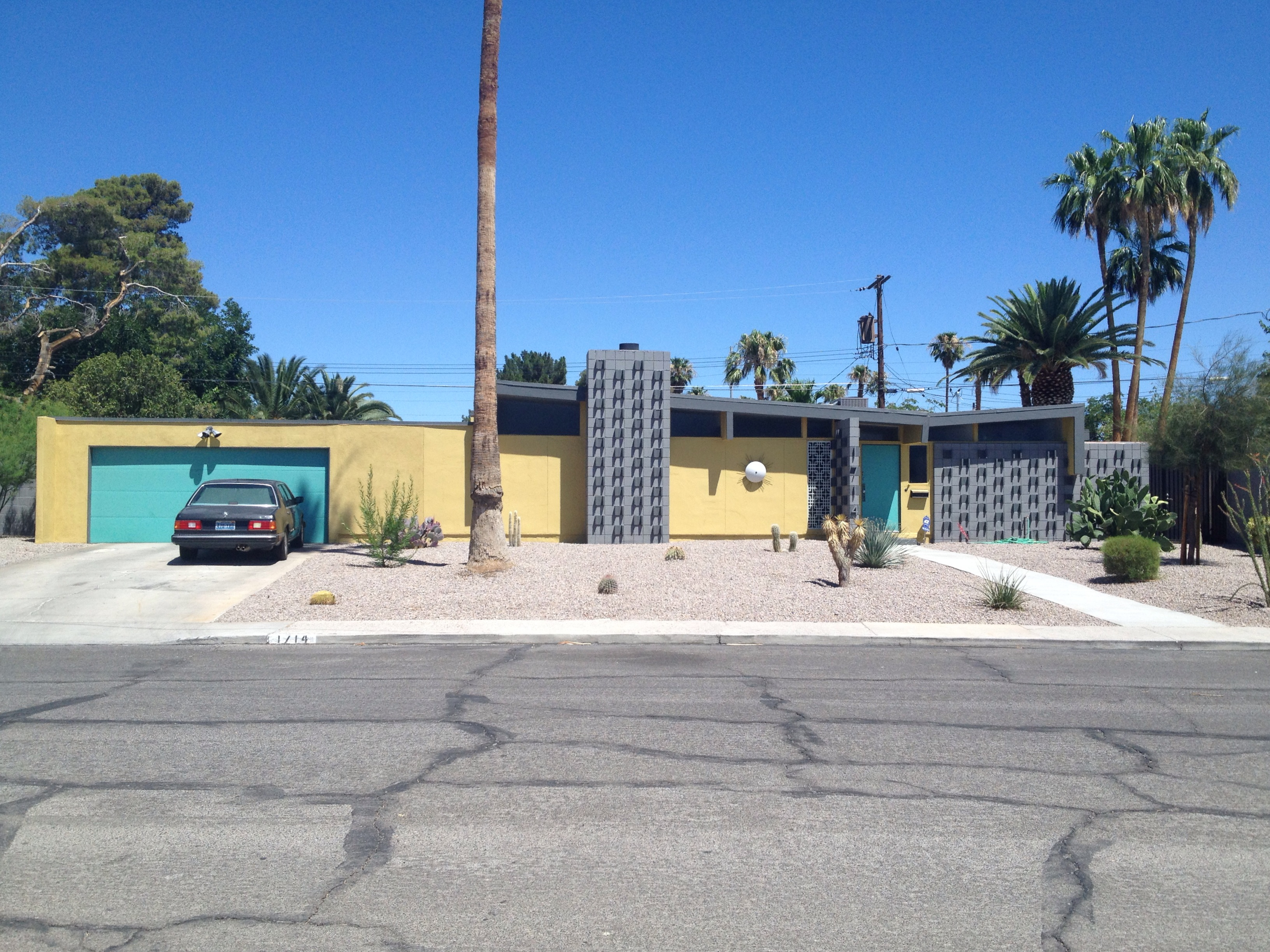
Mid-century butterfly roof in Paradise Palms, Las Vegas, Nevada, US

A butterfly roof (sometimes called a V roof) is a form of roof characterised by an inversion of a standard roof form, with two roof surfaces sloping down from opposing edges to a valley near the middle of the roof. It is so called because its shape resembles a butterfly's wings.

== History ==
The modern butterfly roof is commonly credited to be the creation of William Krisel and Dan Palmer in the late 1950s in Palm Springs, California. It has been estimated that starting in 1957, they created nearly 2,000 houses in a series of developments that were popularly known as the Alexander Tract, which has been described by historian Alan Hess as "the largest Modernist housing subdivision in the United States." Krisel confirms that while his work popularized the form, he was not its originator.

== Timeline ==
The timeline of the emergence of the butterfly roof:

- 1930: Le Corbusier, the Swiss-French architect, first used the butterfly roof form in his design of Maison Errazuriz, a vacation house in Chile.
- 1933: Antonin Raymond, the Czech-born architect, used this form on a house in Japan, whose design was featured in Architectural Record in 1934.
- 1943: Oscar Niemeyer designs and builds the Pampulha Yacht Club, in Belo Horizonte, Brazil, which was widely published.
- 1945: Marcel Breuer used this form on his Geller House project in Long Island, New York, US.
- 1950: Joseph Eichler builds the first housing tract featuring this form in Redwood City, California, US called Atherwood.
- 1957: Krisel's first use of the form in Twin Palms neighborhood of Palm Springs, California, US.

== Structure ==
Butterfly roofs are commonly associated in the US with 20th century mid-century modern architecture. They were also commonly used in Georgian and Victorian terraced house architecture of British cities, where they are alternatively termed "London" roofs.

The form has no gutter as rainwater can run off the roof in no more than two locations, at either end of the valley, often into a scupper or downspout. The form may be symmetrical, with the valley located in the center, or asymmetrical with an off-center valley. The valley itself may be flat, with a central roof cricket diverting water towards the valley ends, or sloping if the entire roof form is tilted towards one end of the valley.

The roof also allows for higher perimeter walls, with clerestory windows allowing light penetration without impacting privacy.

== In creative works ==
A large house with a butterfly roof features prominently in the 2009 British TV crime drama trilogy Red Riding as 'Shangri-La', the home of corrupt property developer John Dawson, played by Sean Bean.

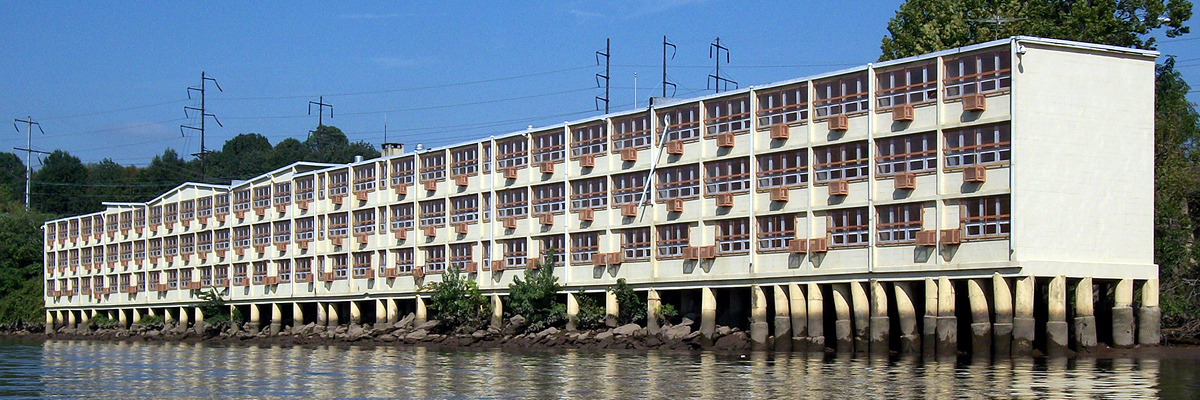
University Motor Inn with partial butterfly roof, left end, on the Schuylkill River in Philadelphia, 1960

== See also ==
- Barrel roof
- Board roof
