= 101–109 Wandsworth Road =

Grade II listed houses in Vauxhall, London

- Numbers 101–105 on the left, with number 107 and part of number 109 on the right, in 2022
- Interactive map of 101–109 Wandsworth Road
- 51.4836°N 0.1267°W
- Location: Vauxhall, London Borough of Lambeth, England

History
- Built: Early 19th century

Listed Building – Grade II
- Official name: 101, 103 and 105, Wandsworth Road SW8
- Designated: 26 November 1974
- Reference no.: 1081046

Listed Building – Grade II
- Official name: 107 and 109, Wandsworth Road SW8
- Designated: 26 November 1974
- Reference no.: 1357949

101–109 Wandsworth Road is a row of five early-19th-century houses in Vauxhall, London Borough of Lambeth. The terrace (formerly known as Belgrave Place, Belgrave Terrace) once consisted of six houses, the sixth being on the corner of Miles Street. The five remaining houses are three storeys high with stock brick facades. The three taller houses (101–105) have basements. The northern three houses and the southern two houses were listed separately (Grade II) in 1974.

The houses were no longer used for residential purposes by the mid-1990s, with some of the upper floors suffering fire damage. In 1997 Lambeth Council approved plans to convert 101–107 into flats, and to build a new house at 111 (on the corner). The terrace was retained while offices and warehouses behind it were demolished for the Vauxhall Square development (2018–2019).

== Location ==
101–109 Wandsworth Road highlighted on an Ordnance Survey map, revised 1893–1894.

The terrace is located on the east side of Wandsworth Road, just north of the corner house (111). Behind the terrace is the Vauxhall Square development, which extends to Bondway and Parry Street. Brunswick House (built 1758) is located on the opposite side of Wandsworth Road, near the junction with Parry Street. The terrace is located outside the Vauxhall Conservation Area, the boundary of which runs near the corner of Parry Street and Bondway.

== Architecture ==
=== Exterior ===
Front elevation, showing differences in height, floor levels and basements.

Each house has two windows on each upper floor, although the floor levels vary, and the roofline drops between 105 and 107. Donald Insall Associates suggested that the variation may be due to the development of the houses by two different developers.

Flat arches of gauged brickwork span the sash windows (with glazing bars) at 101–105, which are set within stucco-lined recesses. The round-arched doorways have three-panelled doors with cornices and patterned fanlights, set on impost blocks. At 107 and 109 the ground-floor windows are round-headed. According to the list entry, there are replacement doors and blocked fanlights.

The butterfly roofs have internal slopes, behind parapets. In 2025, altered brickwork was recorded on the facades of 107 and 109 and on the side wall of 101. The modern corner house has been designed to match the terrace.

=== Interiors ===
At 103, original window panelling and other joinery was retained, as well as the cornices. Denis M. Browne's drawings (1997) show the hall arch at 105 to be repaired, and two doors at 101 that could potentially be restored. Although many of the upper floors were rebuilt after fires, stairs, doors and mouldings were retained at 101, 103, 107 and 109 when the houses were surveyed in 2017.

== History ==
=== Development of Belgrave Place ===
Belgrave Place is shown on William Faden's 1819 revision of Richard Horwood's map. On John Cary's 1822 map, the terrace is shown next to the turn off to Nine Elms. (This area was left blank on Horwood's 1813 map.) The architect and builder are unknown. The construction of Vauxhall Bridge (1816) stimulated the development along Wandsworth Road, which was the turnpike road from London to Kingston.

Miles Street was developed on the Bond estate. The estate was acquired by John and Sarah Bond in 1766. A private Act of Parliament (1778) gave them powers to grant leases. Small plots with long gardens were let on the estate. Parry Street, Wyvil Road, Bond Street (later Bondway) were also developed on the estate.

On the 1843 tithe map, front and rear gardens are shown on the row of houses. There are particularly long plots behind the houses (now) 101 and 103. Three of the rear gardens (101, 107 and 109) were reduced in length by 1914. In 1871, the street was re-numbered. 1–5 Belgrave Terrace became 101–109 Wandsworth Road. The corner house (6 Belgrave Place) became 111.

=== Occupants and uses ===
The piano maker, George Warren, is listed in directories of the 1830s as being in Belgrave Place, but without a house number. Caroline Austen, a dressmaker, worked at 4 (later 107) Wandsworth Road. In July 1866 she took on Louisa Wright as an apprentice for two years (premium £25). This is recorded in the register of the Wiltshire Society, which paid for the apprenticeships of poor children from Wiltshire in London.

Nine Elms railway station was the London terminus of the London and Southampton Railway from its opening in 1838 until 1848, when passenger services were transferred to Waterloo. Brunswick House was acquired in two stages (1854, 1855) by the London and South Western Railway. It became a railway workers' institute and club.

St Anne's Church was built at the far end of Miles Street, to replace South Lambeth Chapel. While the church was being built (1870s), the congregation met at Eldon School, which is next to the terrace (99 Wandsworth Road).

Walter Hardy, a slate enameller, worked at 107 in the 1890s. He also had premises on Miles Street and outbuildings behind 107 and 109. In the 1909–1910 directories, Adam Osborne (decorator) is listed at 101. A. H. Lavers and Co. (lime merchants) are listed at 103. Much of Lavers's stock was transported from Kent by Thames barge. Bricks, tiles, chimney pots were sent by rail or cart from their cement works and wharf on Nine Elms Lane. In 1921, dining rooms were operated at the corner house (111) by Henry William Barker. It appears that 101 and 103 were returned to residential use by 1928.

=== Decline and restoration in the 20th century ===
The terrace is not shown on the London County Council map of bomb damage in the Second World War. In 1964 an application to replace 101–111 Wandsworth Road, 22–32 Miles Street with offices, garage, petrol station was refused as it did not comply with the County of London Development Plan.

Nine Elms Lane was located just north of Miles Street on Wandsworth Road. In 1970–1971 the junction was moved north, to face Parry Street. The flower market at New Covent Garden Market was built on the former railway site, across the road (1974). A council photograph (c. 1970) shows 113–129 Wandsworth Road (south of Miles Street). A photograph from 1975 shows the shoe repairer and hairdresser in the (now demolished) single storey timber shops at 30–32 Miles Street.

The houses 101–105 and 107–109 were listed separately on 26 November 1974. Some of the original sash windows were still in place in 1995. A planning decision in 1995 noted that windows were bricked up in two of the houses. In November 1996, Browne found fire damage at 101 and 105. 111 had already been demolished.

In June 1997, Lambeth Council approved Browne's plans for two flats each at 101, 103, 105, 107 and a three-storey house at 111. By August 2000, the front windows had been glazed and the boards removed. Les Kerry photographed the terrace for Images of England.

=== Vauxhall Square redevelopment ===
101–111 Wandsworth Road (September 2010)

In Lambeth's 2015 Local Plan, it is stated that the listed houses should be retained. Listed building consent was granted (August 2017) for work to the roofs, fire protection, secondary glazing and insulation at 101, 103, 107 and 109. Some rebuilding of rear extensions at 107 and 109 was also approved.

Terrace wrapped in scaffolding (June 2018)

The offices and warehouses behind the terrace were demolished in 2018–2019. Lambeth Council also considered 113 Wandsworth Road as a site for a tall building (2019). It was found to be unsuitable, partly because of the impact on the terrace.

In 2024 and 2025, the Design Review Panel asked how the proposed buildings and planting would affect the terrace. Lambeth planning officers believed that the planting and public spaces would improve the setting of the terrace. They also anticipated that there would be substantial losses of daylight and sunlight at 101–111. They considered this to be acceptable, given the public benefits of the scheme and the scale of development planned for the site.

== Heritage significance ==
The terrace is the last surviving row of houses on a block that was once occupied by housing and industry (according to the Townscape Consultancy). Historic England describes the terrace's contribution to Vauxhall as "understated but important". It is evidence of 19th-century residential development. It also describes Brunswick House as a reminder of the rural past of Vauxhall and 18th-century industry in the area.

== Bibliography ==
- Donald Insall Associates (May 2017). 101–103 & 107–109 Wandsworth Road: Historic Building Report. Lambeth planning application 17/02406/LB, document 1905293.
- F. H. W. Sheppard (ed.) (1956). Survey of London, vol. 26: Lambeth, Southern Area. London County Council, via British History Online.
