= Fairglen Additions =

Historic tract housing in San Jose, California

- Fairglen Additions (Unit 1, Unit 2, and Unit 3)
- U.S. National Register of Historic Places
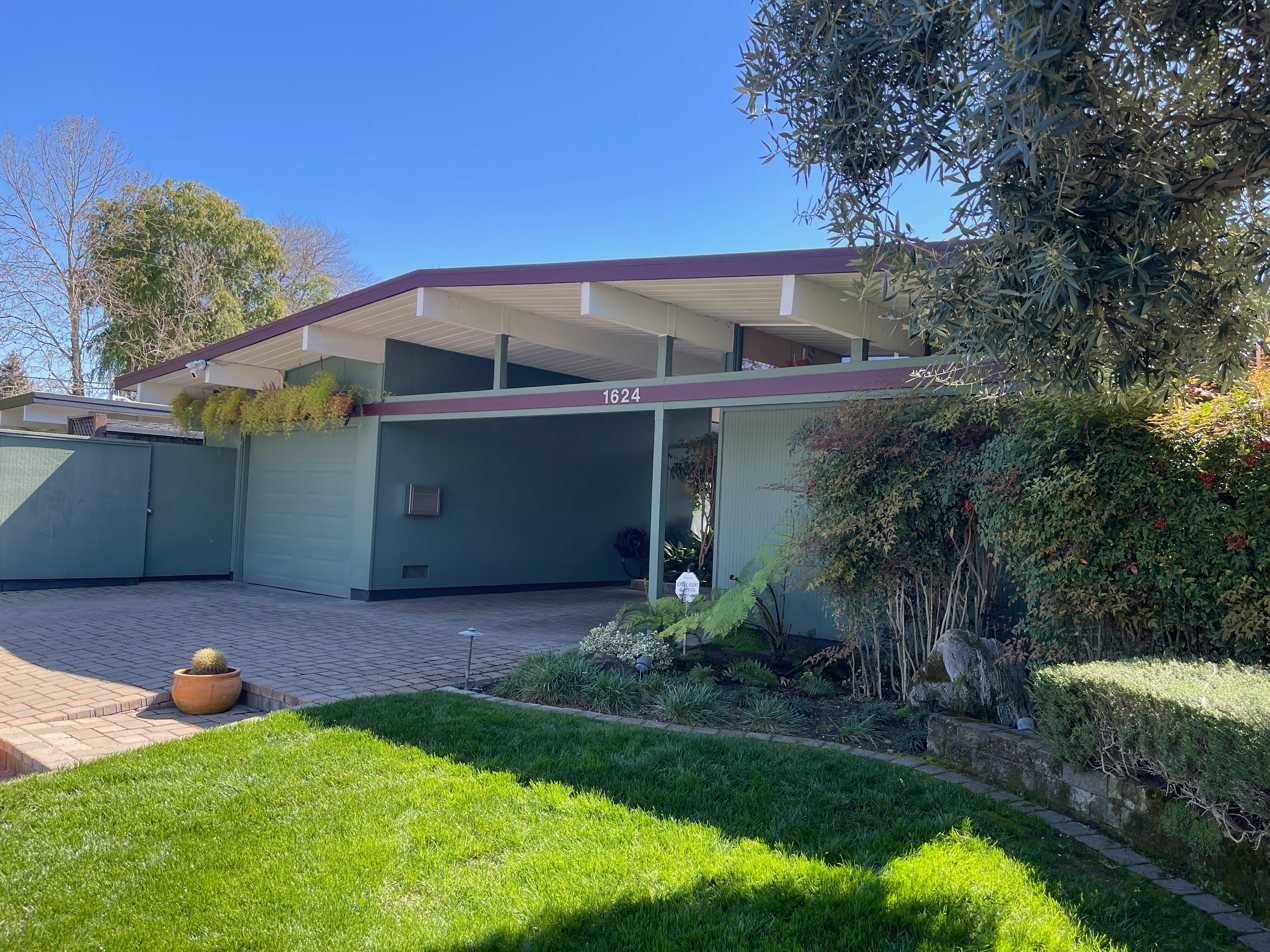
- Fairglen Addition with square plan with an atrium between garage and the bedroom

- Location within San Jose, California
- Location: Willow Glen neighborhood of San Jose, California, United States
- Coordinates: 37°16′53″N 121°54′12″W
- Area: 6,000 square feet (560 m^{2}) lots
- Built: 1959; 67 years ago; 1961; 65 years ago
- Built by: Joseph Eichler
- Architect: Anshen & Allen; Jones Emmons & Associates; Claude Oakland Architect & Associates
- Architectural style: Mid-century modern
- NRHP reference No.: 100004036
- Added to NRHP: June 6, 2019

The Fairglen Additions is an example of Mid-century modern-style tract housing located in San Jose, California, US. Comprising 218 single-family houses within the Willow Glen neighborhood of San Jose, this district was built between 1959 and 1961. The additions were developed by real estate developer Joseph Eichler and designed by architectural firms Anshen & Allen, Jones Emmons & Associates, and Claude Oakland Architect & Associates. Thirteen distinct home plans were executed on approximately 6,000 square feet (560 m^{2}) lots. These residences feature open floor plans that accentuate privacy and the seamless transition between indoor and outdoor living, characteristic of Eichler homes and subdivisions. The Fairglen Additions was officially recognized and listed on the National Register of Historic Places on June 6, 2019.

== History ==
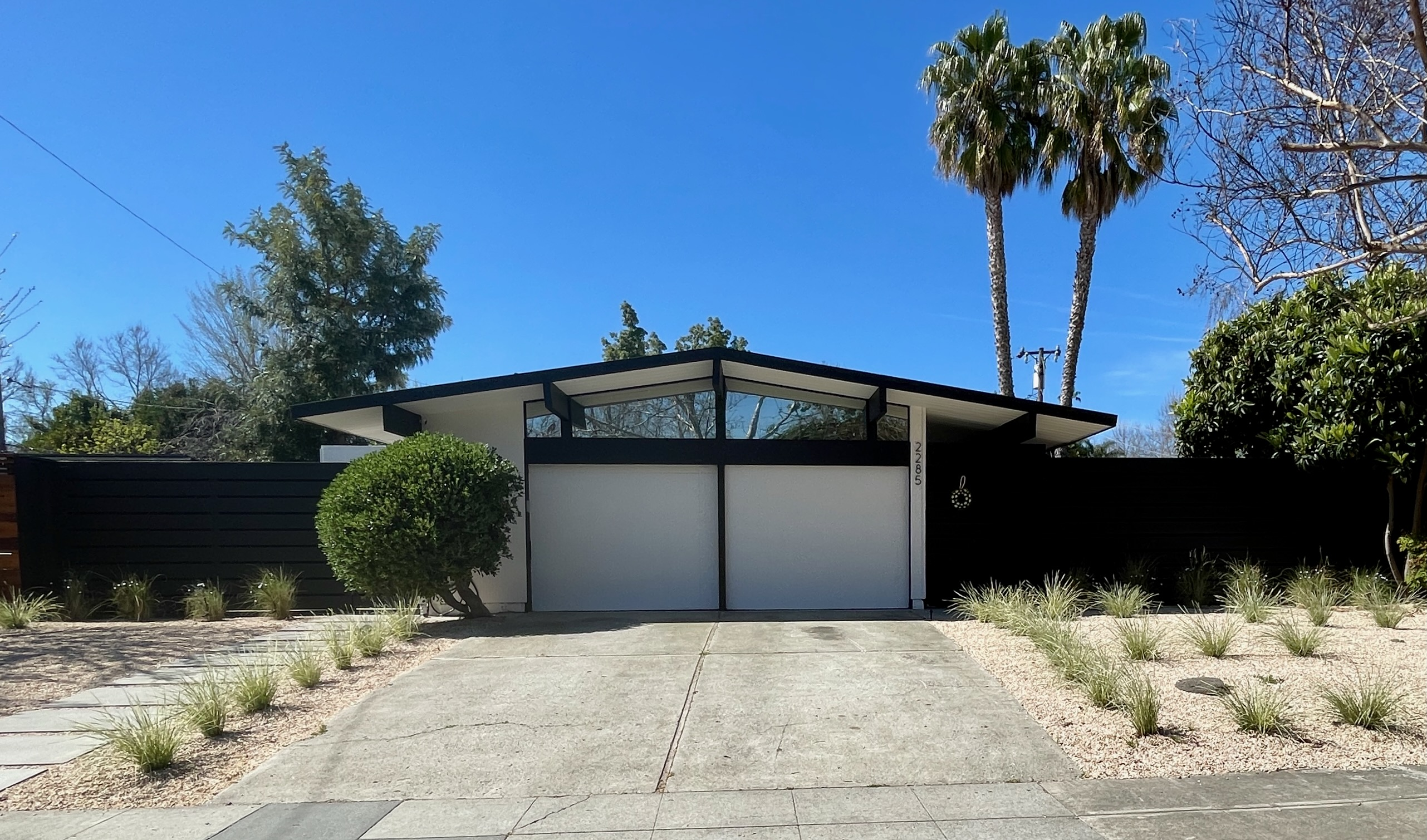
Fairglen Addition with garage and entry to living area

The Fairglen Additions neighborhood forms the core and most expansive segment of Joseph Eichler's Fairglen project in Willow Glen. Between 1950 and 1974, he constructed more than 11,000 residences in California recognized as "Eichlers".

Comprising 218 residences, the Fairglen Additions were built between 1959 and 1961 across three parcels of land. The initial design of site plans and residences was undertaken by architectural firms Anshen and Allen from San Francisco, and Jones and Emmons & Associates from Los Angeles. Completion of the project was handled by Claude Oakland Architect & Associates, based in San Francisco. Situated within a 1952 urban expansion zone southwest of San Jose's early Willow Glen neighborhood, the subdivision features single-family homes on separate lots, forming a cohesive community. These detached, one-story residences typically have flat or gently pitched gable roofs. Emphasizing privacy, they have open floor plans and modest facades, often integrating garages facing the street. Their construction employs a mix of post-and-beam framing, extensive glazing including clerestory windows, and concrete slab foundations with radiant heating—hallmarks of Joseph Eichler's Mid-century Modern designs. Despite occasional individual modifications such as altered rooflines or added second stories over time, the neighborhood retains significant architectural elements indicative of postwar housing developments.

The Fairglen Additions are situated along various streets, encompassing Booksin, Fairwood, Fairlawn, Fairorchard, and Fairorchard Avenues, Fairhill Lane, Fairdell and Fairglen Drives, Andalusia Way, Fairvalley, Fairoak, and Fairgrove Courts. The additions were on ranch property formerly occupied by fruit orchards. The development extended over more than five blocks and was organized in a southwestward layout. Referred to collectively as The Fairglen Additions, consisting of Unit 1, Unit 2, and Unit 3. Unit 1, comprising 73 lots, commenced construction from the southwestern intersection of Curtner and Booksin Avenues, following a grid pattern with cul-de-sacs interspersed throughout. Unit 2, with 61 lots, extended the grid pattern from the western edge of Fairglen Avenue, gradually transitioning into a grid layout along the southern stretch of Fairlawn Avenue. Lastly, Unit 3, featuring 84 lots, progressed from the northern side of Fair Orchard Avenue, concluding with a winding grid pattern along the southern side of Andalusia Way.

== Design ==
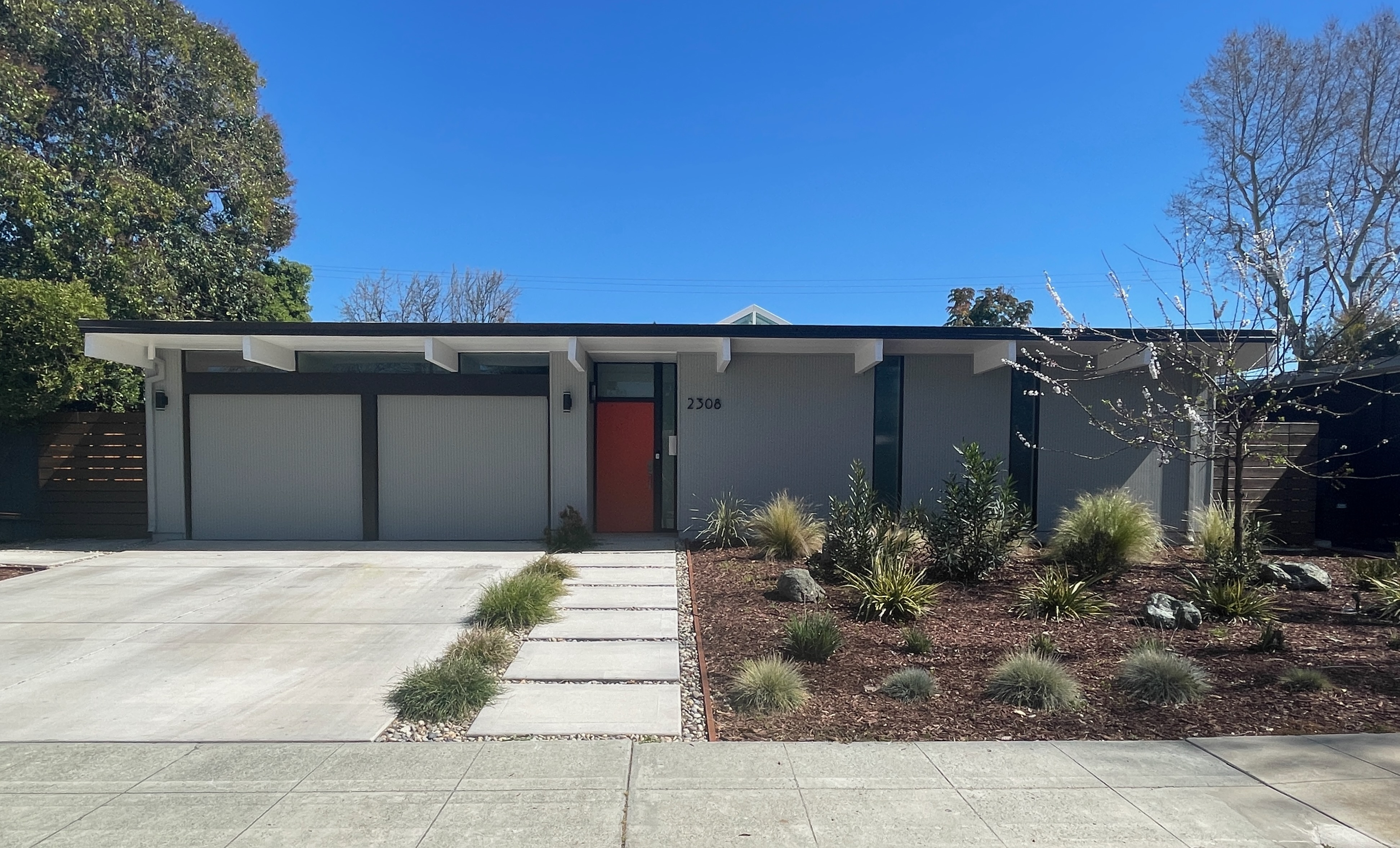
Fairglen Addition with double-car garage and entry

The residences have expansive 50 ft (15 m)-wide open floor plans, designed to enhance privacy and seamlessly blend indoor and outdoor living spaces. Their modest facades typically incorporate integrated fencing and garages facing the street. Six different floor plan layouts generally fall into two categories: L-shaped plans featuring a front courtyard nestled between the garage and the living/dining area, or square plans with an atrium situated between the garage and the bedroom wing.

The initial interior materials and finishes were chosen with a focus on simplicity, ease of upkeep, longevity, accessibility, and affordability. The ceiling is formed by the stained underside of 2 inches (51 mm) by 8 inches (200 mm) tongue-and-groove redwood roof decking. Interior walls have deep-toned Philippine mahogany veneer paneling. Flooring consists of 12 inches (300 mm) asphalt tiles covering concrete slab on-grade foundations with radiant heating. A notable feature in many models is the built-in breakfast bar, designed to swing into the multipurpose room and extend out into a spacious dining table.

The homes have integrated landscaping elements such as divided-concrete driveways, pathways, organic-shaped courtyard patios, and terraces set back from the floor-to-ceiling windows to accommodate landscaping. Additionally, they feature benches and front privacy fences with vertical grooves that blended into the front elevations.

== Historical status ==
The Fairglen Additions was nominated to the National Register of Historic Places on February 1, 2019. and registered on June 6, 2019.

The Fairglen Additions is historically significant in architecture as a recognizable example of mid-century modern postwar architecture, crafted by master builder Joseph Eichler. The period of significance is from 1959 to 1961, aligning with the construction timeline of the subdivision.

== See also ==
- National Register of Historic Places listings in Santa Clara County, California
