= Greenmeadow (Palo Alto, California) =

Historic house in California, United States

- U.S. National Register of Historic Places
- U.S. Historic district
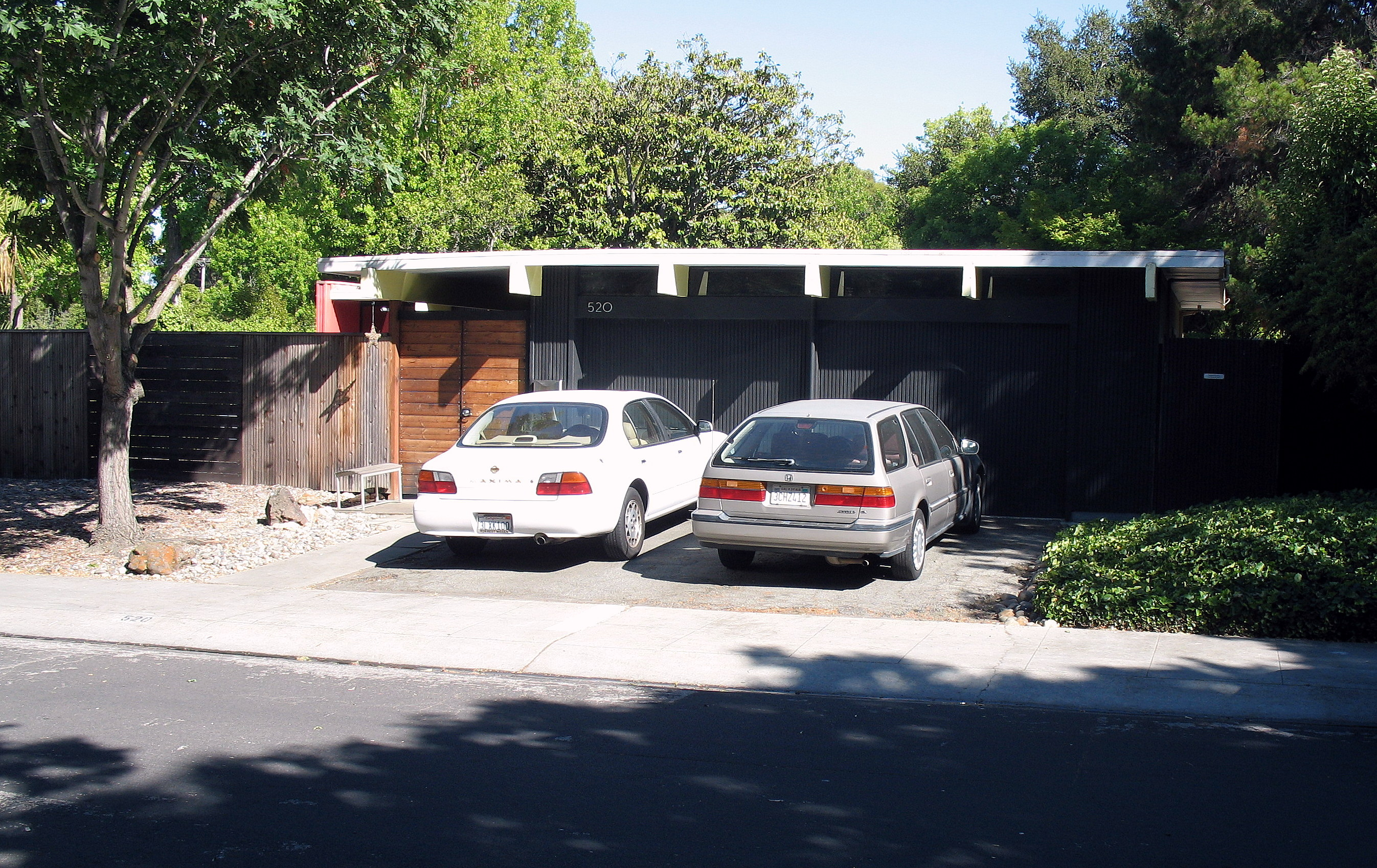
- 520 El Capitan Place

- Location within San Jose, California Location within California Location within the United States
- Location: Nelson Dr., El Capitan Pl., Adobe Pl., Creekside Dr., Palo Alto, California
- Coordinates: 37°24′53″N 122°6′45″W
- Area: 73 acres (30 ha)
- Architect: Jones, A. Quincy; Emmons, Frederick
- Architectural style: Modern Movement
- NRHP reference No.: 04000862
- Added to NRHP: July 28, 2005

Greenmeadow is a subdivision located in southern Palo Alto, California.

== History ==
Developer Joseph Eichler built the development, which includes 243 single-story homes, in 1954–55. Architects A. Quincy Jones and Frederick Emmons designed the plans for the modernist homes; homebuyers chose from six models, which they could modify at an additional cost. Jones was the primary architect for the Greenmeadow properties and was responsible for the homes' thin, lofty roofs and open, free-flowing interiors. Eichler had already achieved success as one of the first developers to bring modernism to affordable single-family homes, and Greenmeadow represented the continuing development and refinement of his work. Jones and Emmons built reputations as home designers while working with Eichler, designing roughly 5,000 of Eichler's 11,000 houses.

The subdivision was added to the National Register of Historic Places on July 28, 2005.

== See also ==
- National Register of Historic Places listings in Santa Clara County, California
- Monta Loma, Mountain View, a nearby neighborhood
