= John Calder Mackay =

American post-war real estate developer

John Calder Mackay (April 20, 1920 - November 21, 2014) was an American post-war real estate developer, best known for his modernist tract homes built by the company he co-founded, Mackay Homes. He also served on the board of directors for the Children's Health Council and was one of the founders of the Palo Alto Medical Foundation.

== Mackay Homes ==
=== Early years ===
In 1948 John Mackay built the first commercial building in downtown Menlo Park, California (on Santa Cruz Avenue). He founded the home building company Mackay Homes in 1950.

=== Design ===
Mackay homes in the Modernist tract style are examples of Modernist architecture that has come to be known as "California Modern". These homes typically feature glass walls, post-and-beam construction, enclosed patios and open floor plans in a style indebted to Frank Lloyd Wright and Mies van der Rohe. The Mackay homes were designed by Anshen & Allen, the same architects who worked with Joseph Eichler. The homes were known for their wonderful light and use of outdoor living space. Mackay's have raised foundations and forced air heating, unlike Eichler's slab foundations and radiant heating.

Mackay Homes built homes in other architectural styles as well, but they are best known for their California Modernist homes.

=== History ===
In the 1950s, Mackay-manufactured homes often represented moving from farmland or remote locations into the newly developed suburbs. For some, this was a dream that had spanned multiple generations and ushered them closer to middle class.

Joseph Eichler's son Ned Eichler stated in a 2001 interview, "There were Kaufman and Broad, there was Mackay Homes, and there were local builders wherever we were building," when asked about competition in the residential building market in the early years.

Mackay homes were built for 30 years, and included over 15,000 apartments, homes and office parks in 13 states. Many of the developments were located in the San Francisco Bay Area.

=== Mackay Midcentury neighborhoods ===
- Maywood: Santa Clara tract built circa 1954–1955
- Fairmede: Santa Clara tract built c. 1957, with about 100 modern homes, a few blocks from Maywood tract
- Sunshine Meadows: This Santa Clara tract built c. 1953 has homes of a different design and earlier vintage, and many have been greatly altered. The homes in this neighborhood won a National Merit Award from the American Institute of Architects in 1954.
- Sunshine Glen: This Palo Alto tract built c. 1954 is a small neighborhood of Mackay homes near a tract of Eichler homes. The neighborhood won a National Merit Award from the American Institute of Architects.
- Ross Park: Palo Alto tract of 108 units, built c. 1956; most of the homes have been modified.
- Monta Loma: This large Mountain View tract built circa 1954–1956 was originally called "Oakwood". In large part the homes appear intact, and the neighborhood has a variety of home models. Steve Jobs grew up in this neighborhood in a Mackay home on 286 Diablo Avenue.
- Woodlands: Walnut Creek tract built circa 1961–1962

== Personal life ==
Mackay was born April 20, 1920, in Salt Lake City, Utah. He attended Stanford University from 1939 to 1942, and graduated in 1942 with a degree in Pre-Legal. In 1942 he married Ellen Ann Evans and later had four children with her. From 1942 to 1946, Mackay served in the US Navy during Asiatic-Pacific Theater. He returned to Stanford University and graduated with a Juris Doctor in 1948.
