= Sidney Bazett House =

House in California, US

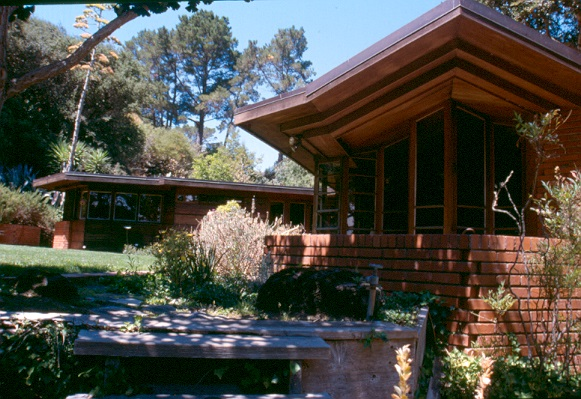
Sidney Bazett House (2002)

The Sidney Bazett House, also known as the Bazett-Frank House, is a Usonian-style home on 101 Reservoir Road in Hillsborough, California, United States, designed in 1939 by American architect Frank Lloyd Wright. Sidney Bazett wrote to the architect that, "With even our meager artistic knowledge,... it was apparent that it would be a shame to have anyone other than Frank Lloyd Wright design our home."

== History ==
The house is laid out on a hexagonal module with red concrete floors (scored with a hexagon to articulate the building grid), brick massing, underfloor heating, wooden built-in benches and bookcases, and a flat roof with deep overhangs for natural cooling. The house is similarly designed to the Hanna House, another Wright design with a hexagonal module, also in California. However, it is "a smaller, less expansive version of the... Hanna House on the Stanford Campus; the clients were friends of the Hanna family."

Construction on the home began in March 1940, under the supervision of Taliesin Fellowship member, Blaine Drake.

However, once constructed, the Bazetts did not occupy their new home for very long. By early 1943, the home was rented out to Joseph Eichler and his family. Eichler was greatly influenced by his time in the home. The experience apparently "inspired" him "to market moderately priced well-designed homes for the middle class." As Eichler and his family solely rented the home, they moved in 1945 when the home was sold to Betty and Louis Frank, who occupied the home for 55 years, which accounts for its "Bazett-Frank" house name. The Franks were also Wright clients. In the mid-1950s, the Franks commissioned Wright to add a playroom onto the structure. As of 2025, the home is owned and occupied by Laurence Frank, the son of Louis and Betty Frank.

== See also ==
- List of Frank Lloyd Wright works
