= Pomeroy Green =

Historic tract housing in San Jose, California

- U.S. National Register of Historic Places
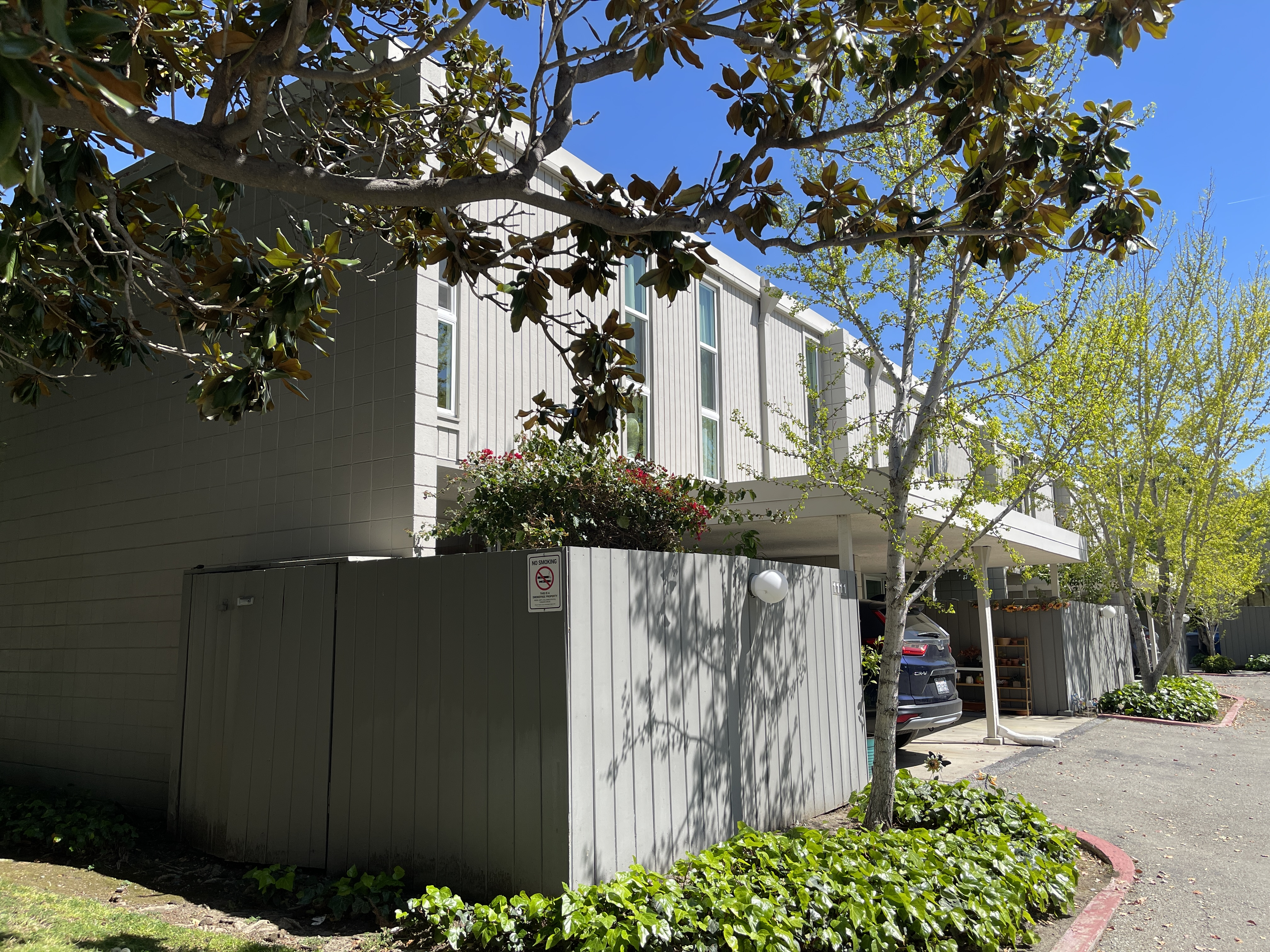
- Pomeroy Green Building

- Location within San Jose, California
- Location: 1087-1151 Pomeroy Avenue Santa Clara, California, US
- Coordinates: 37°20′44″N 121°59′15″W
- Area: 6.5 acres (2.6 ha)
- Built: 1961; 65 years ago
- Built by: Joseph Eichler
- Architect: Claude Oakland; Sasaki, Walker and Associates
- Architectural style: Mid-century modern
- Website: pomeroygreen.org
- NRHP reference No.: 100006330
- Added to NRHP: March 24, 2021

Pomeroy Green is a housing complex in Santa Clara, California, USA, constructed in 1961 by the Mid-Century designer Joseph Eichler. The two-story complex has sixteen multifamily buildings, with a range of configurations per building. Pomeroy Green was registered on the National Register of Historic Places on March 24, 2021, for its role in the use of cluster development.

== History ==
The Pomeroy Green housing complex of 16 multifamily two-story townhouse buildings, alongside a clubhouse. It is located on the northeastern intersection of Pomeroy Avenue and Benton Street, in Santa Clara, California. On July 7, 1961, the subdivision was announced in The Peninsula Times Tribune.

Joseph Eichler designed the community. Pomeroy Green is a resident-owned multi-family housing cooperative. Following its construction, Pomeroy West was built in 1963, by Eichler Homes on the opposite side of the street.

== Design ==
The buildings are designed to surround motor courts, parking lots, or communal spaces, and are constructed with concrete block, wood beams and stucco panels walls and include glass windows and sliding doors at both ends of each townhouse. Uniform in size, each townhouse within a building mirrors its adjacent neighbor. The clubhouse has a construction and style akin to the townhouses.

== Historical status ==
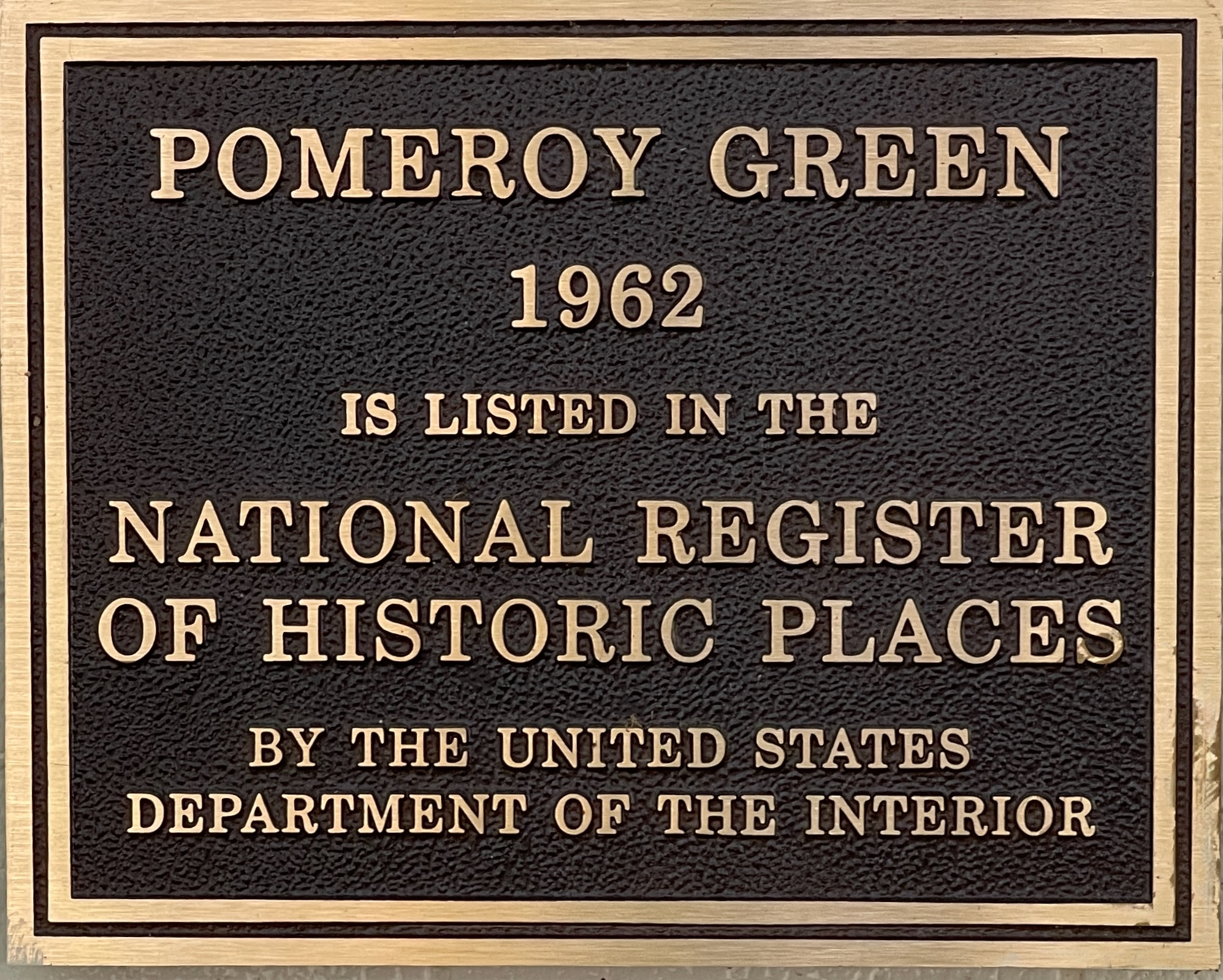
Pomeroy Green Plaque

Pomeroy Green was nominated to the National Register of Historic Places on January 29, 2021. Pomeroy Green is historically significant for its implementation of cluster development in a Modern style.

== See also ==
- National Register of Historic Places listings in Santa Clara County, California
