= Chapel of the Holy Cross (Sedona, Arizona) =

Roman Catholic chapel in Sedona, Arizona, US

Coordinates: 34°49′55″N 111°46′00″W

The Chapel of the Holy Cross
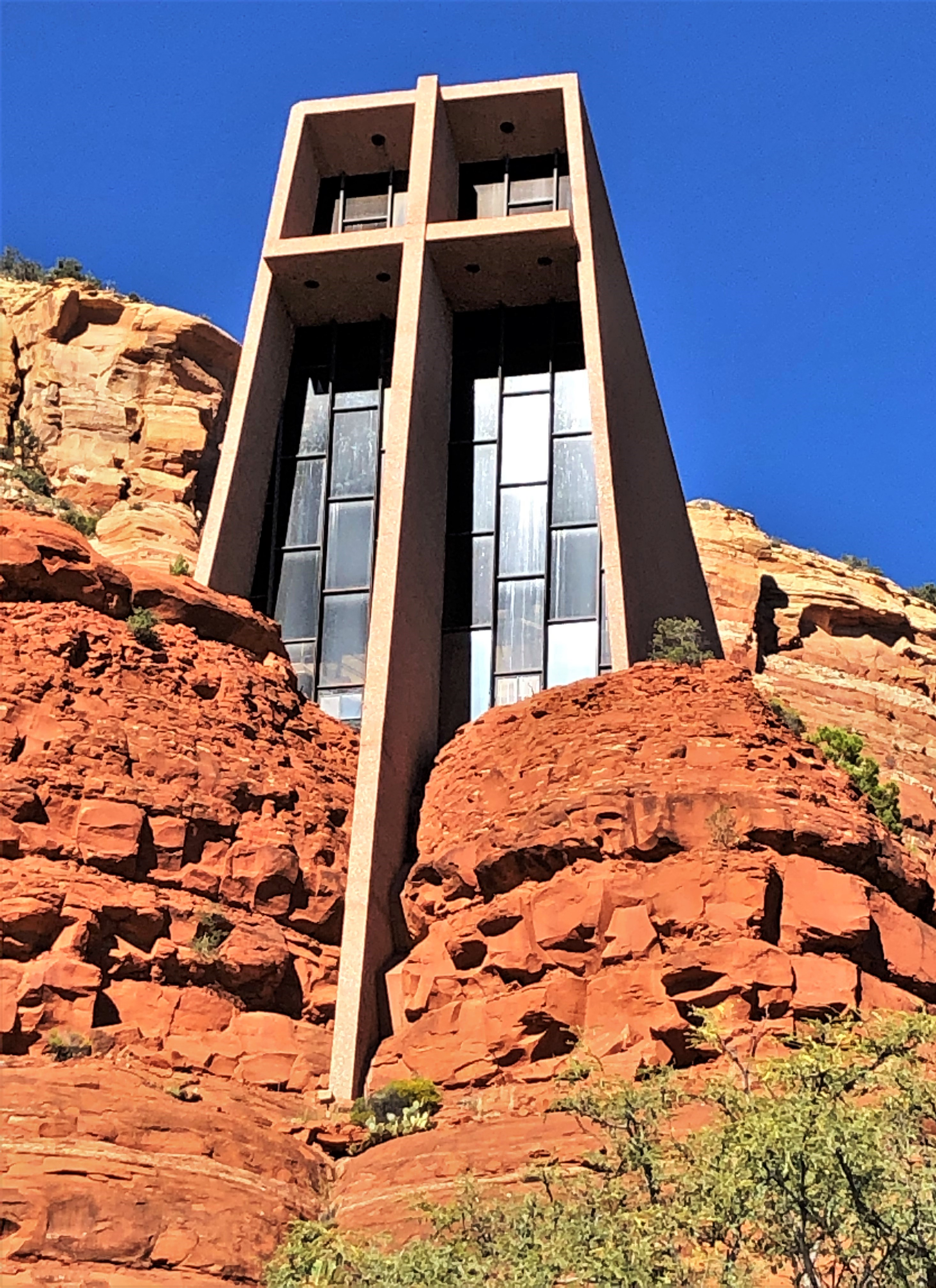
- (2021)

Religion
- Affiliation: Roman Catholic Church

Location
- Location: 780 Chapel Road, Sedona, Arizona
- Interactive map of The Chapel of the Holy Cross

Architecture
- Architects: August K. Strotz and Richard Hein of Anshen & Allen; Robert D. Dewell, Structural Engineer
- Style: Contextualism
- General contractor: William Simpson Construction Company; Fred Coukos, Construction Superintendent
- Groundbreaking: 1954
- Completed: 1956
- Construction cost: $300,000
- Capacity: 150 (50 in pews)

U.S. National Register of Historic Places
- Added to NRHP: October 6, 2011
- NRHP Reference no.: 10000947

Website
- chapeloftheholycross.com

The Chapel of the Holy Cross is a Roman Catholic chapel built from 1954 to 1956 into the red rock buttes of Sedona, Arizona, within the Coconino National Forest. It was inspired and commissioned by local rancher and sculptor Marguerite Brunswig Staude, and was designed by August K. Strotz of the firm of Anshen & Allen, with Richard Hein of the firm as the project architect. The chapel is under the auspices of the episcopal see of the Roman Catholic Diocese of Phoenix and its ministry is conducted by St. John Vianney Parish, Sedona.

The chapel was added to the National Register of Historic Places in 2011.

== History ==
The chapel was inspired and commissioned by local rancher and sculptor Marguerite Brunswig Staude, who had been inspired in 1932 by the newly constructed Empire State Building to build such a church. After an attempt to do so in Budapest, Hungary – with the help of Lloyd Wright, son of architect Frank Lloyd Wright – was abandoned due to the outbreak of World War II, she decided to build the church in her native region.

The chapel, built in honor of Staude's parents, Lucien and Marguerite Brunswig, is on Coconino National Forest land; Senator Barry Goldwater assisted her in obtaining a special-use permit. The chapel's design is by architect August K. Strotz, and the project architect was Richard Hein, both of the Anshen & Allen firm. The architects started the design in 1953 and said the following after viewing the site, "Nature has done everything here. All we have to do is understate."

Robert D. Dewell was the Civil and Structural Engineer, and Earl & Gropp were the Electrical and Mechanical Engineers. Bernard T. Espelage, Bishop of the Diocese of Gallup in New Mexico, approved the plans. The construction supervisor was Fred Coukos of the William Simpson Construction Company, who built the chapel in 18 months at a cost of $300,000. Upwards of 25 tons of rock was moved without the use of dynamite. The chapel was completed in 1956. Upon completion, Bishop Espelage assigned Father John Driscoll as the pastor of the new chapel.

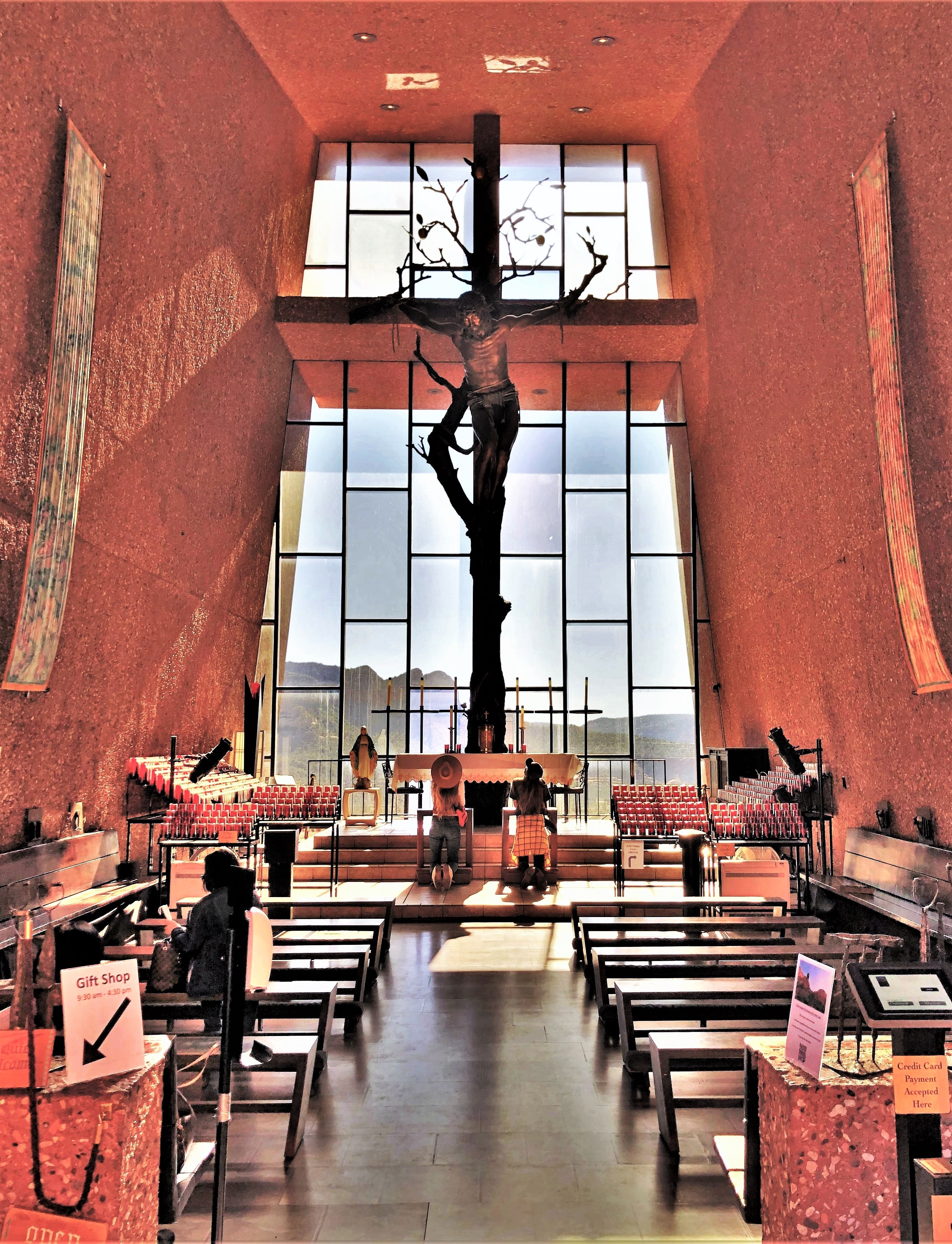
The interior of the chapel

The project received an award citation in the 1954 Progressive Architecture Award Program. The citation stated "The problem here was one very similar to that at Burnam Hoyt's Red Rocks Amphitheater near Denver--using the minimum of construction to define and utilize a naturally beautiful rock outcropping. The bold, simple structure is left completely open. The symbolic cross, though conventional, is also an important structural element--handled in a visually exciting way."

The American Institute of Architects gave the Chapel its Award of Honor in 1957. In the sculptor's words, "Though Catholic in faith, as a work of art the Chapel has a universal appeal. Its doors will ever be open to one and all, regardless of creed, that God may come to life in the souls of all men and be a living reality."

In 2007, Arizonans voted the chapel to be one of the Seven Man-Made Wonders of Arizona.

== Architectural features ==
Upon arrival, visitors walk up a ramp from the parking area to the chapel. The long, curved ramp is constructed of textured concrete.

The main feature of the chapel is a 90 ft (27.4 m) tall iron cross on the southwestern wall, which serves both aesthetic and structural purposes. Staude was inspired by the powerful image of the steel framework in the Empire State Building and other skyscrapers. Her idea for the cross was carried out by sculptor Keith Monroe, from San Francisco. The cross holds both the altar and Corpus on the interior.

The walls and cross are constructed with reinforced coarse-aggregate concrete, 1 foot (0.3 m) in thickness. Inside and out, the walls were sandblasted to unveil the textured aggregate. To reduce glare, smokey-gray-colored glass is utilized at the two ends of the chapel. The floor is made of concrete, which is trowel-finished. The front doors are constructed of aluminum with horn-shaped handles.

The effect of the materials pallet combined with the simple angled shapes in the chapel creates an impression of grandeur and strength. This is fitting, as it sits at the base of a 1,500 ft (457.2 m) cliff and is surrounded by massive pieces of sandstone.

The chapel seats up to 150 people. The confessional, office, two sacristies, and services are located in the basement of the building.

== Gallery ==
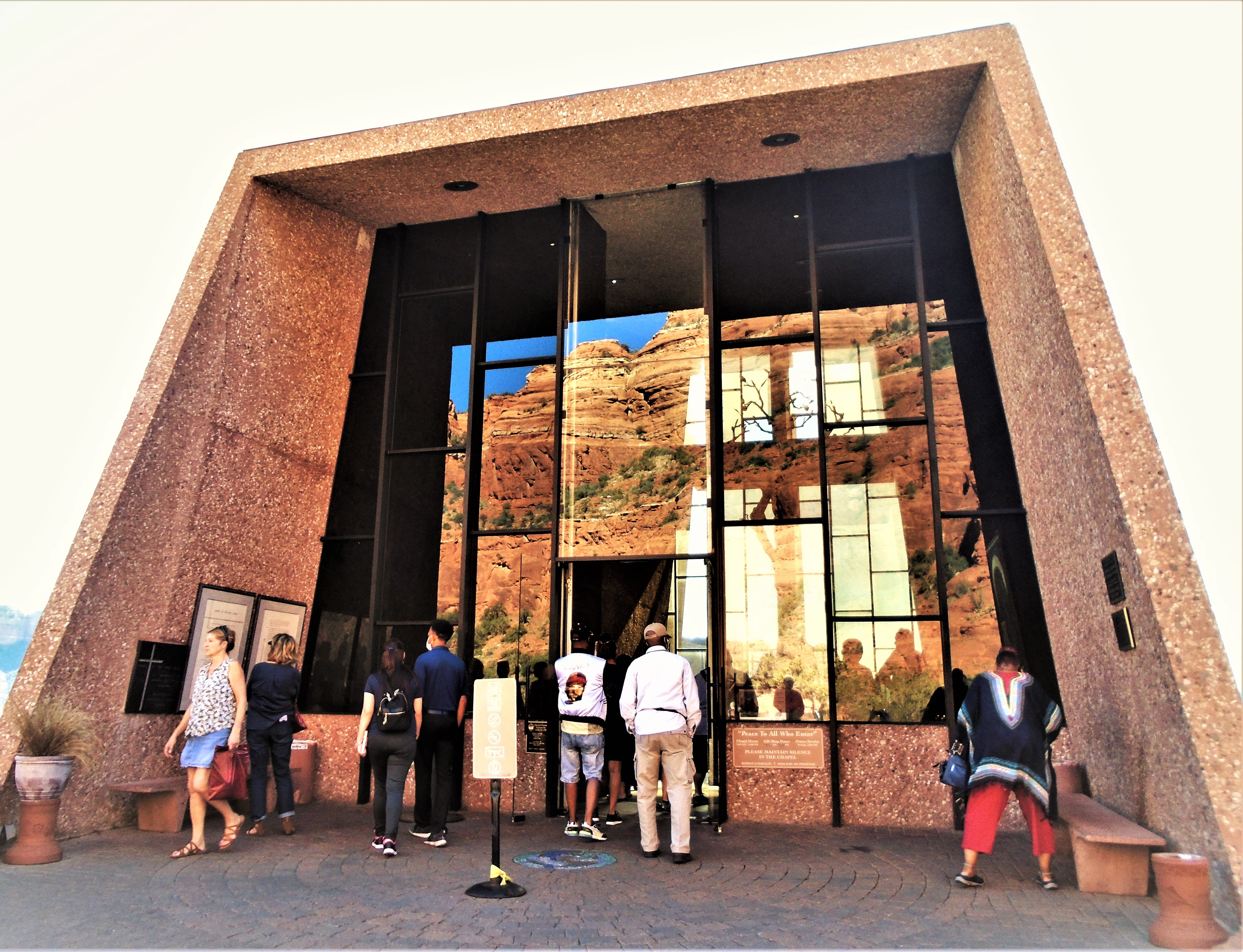
The entrance to the chapel

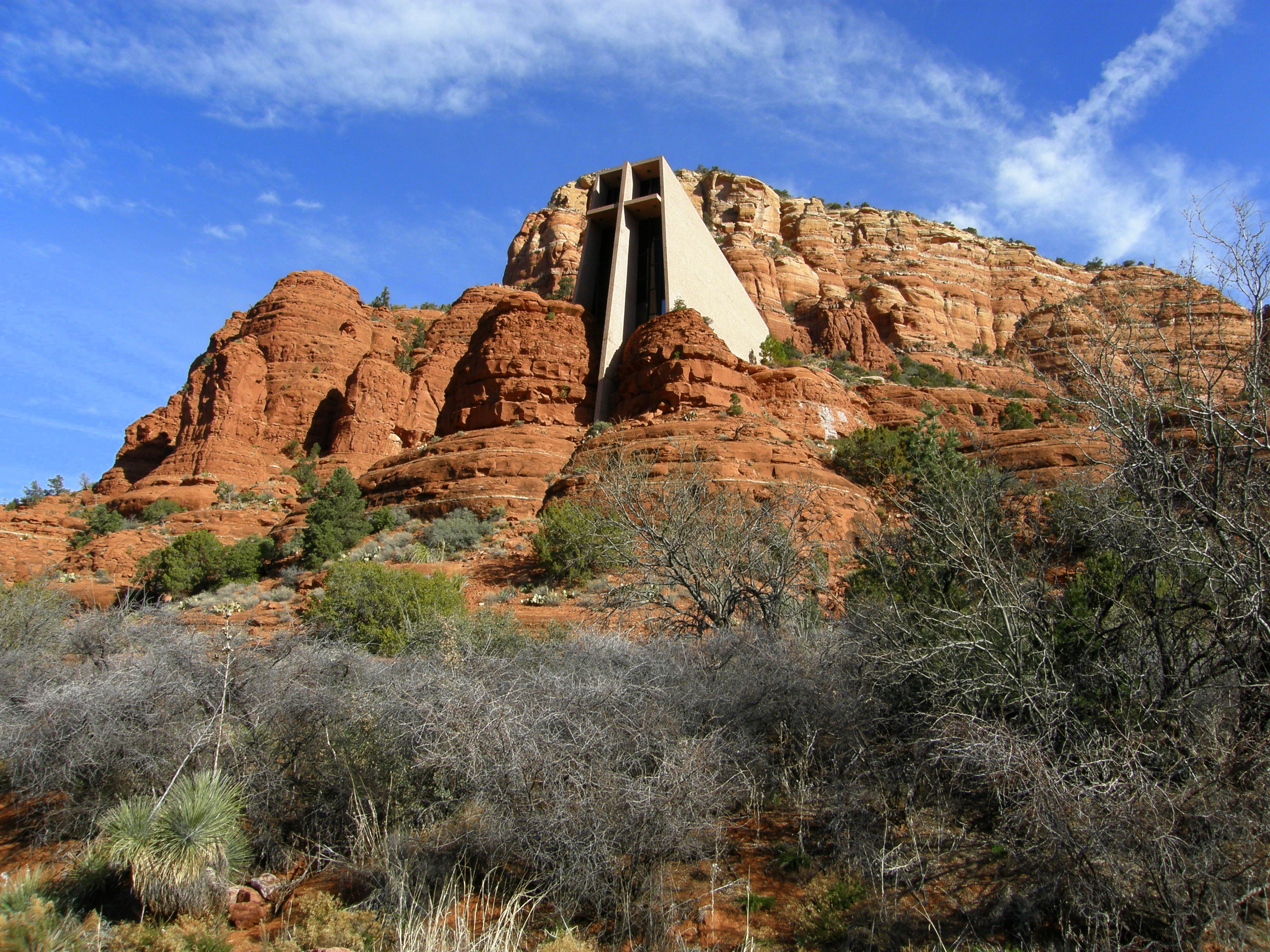
The chapel in context

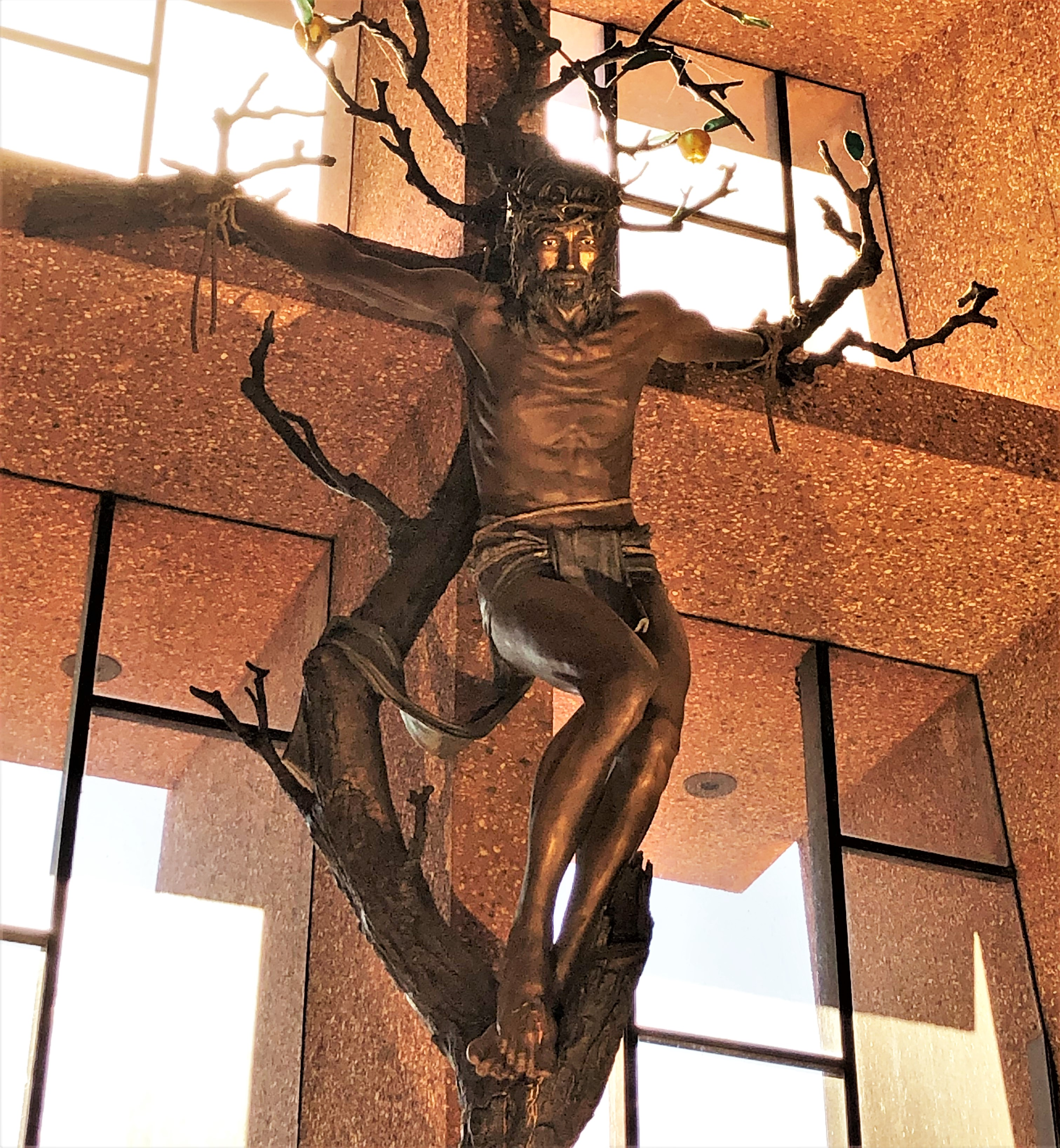
A closer view of the sculpture of Jesus Christ on the Cross in the chapel

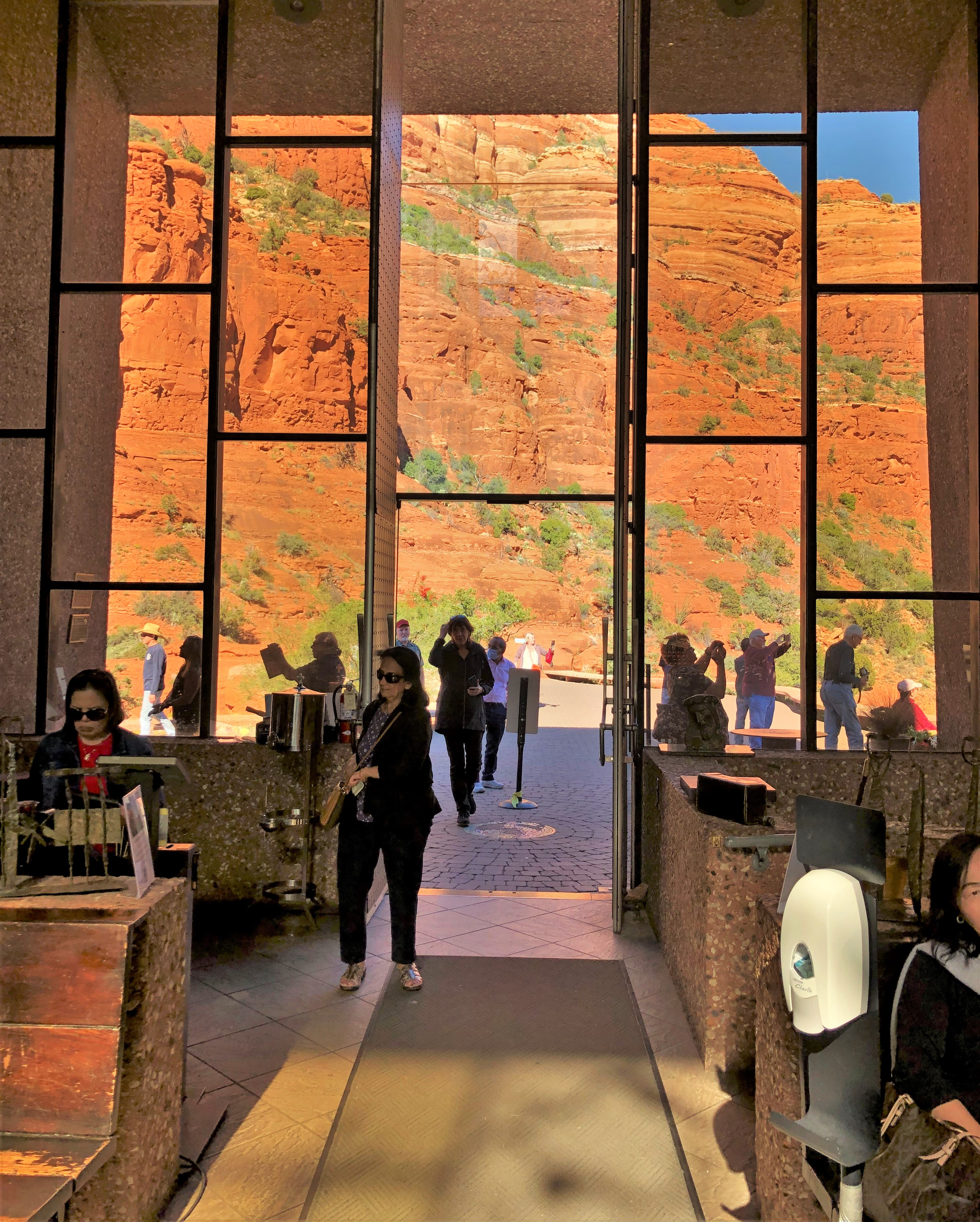
The view from inside through the entrance, to the northeast

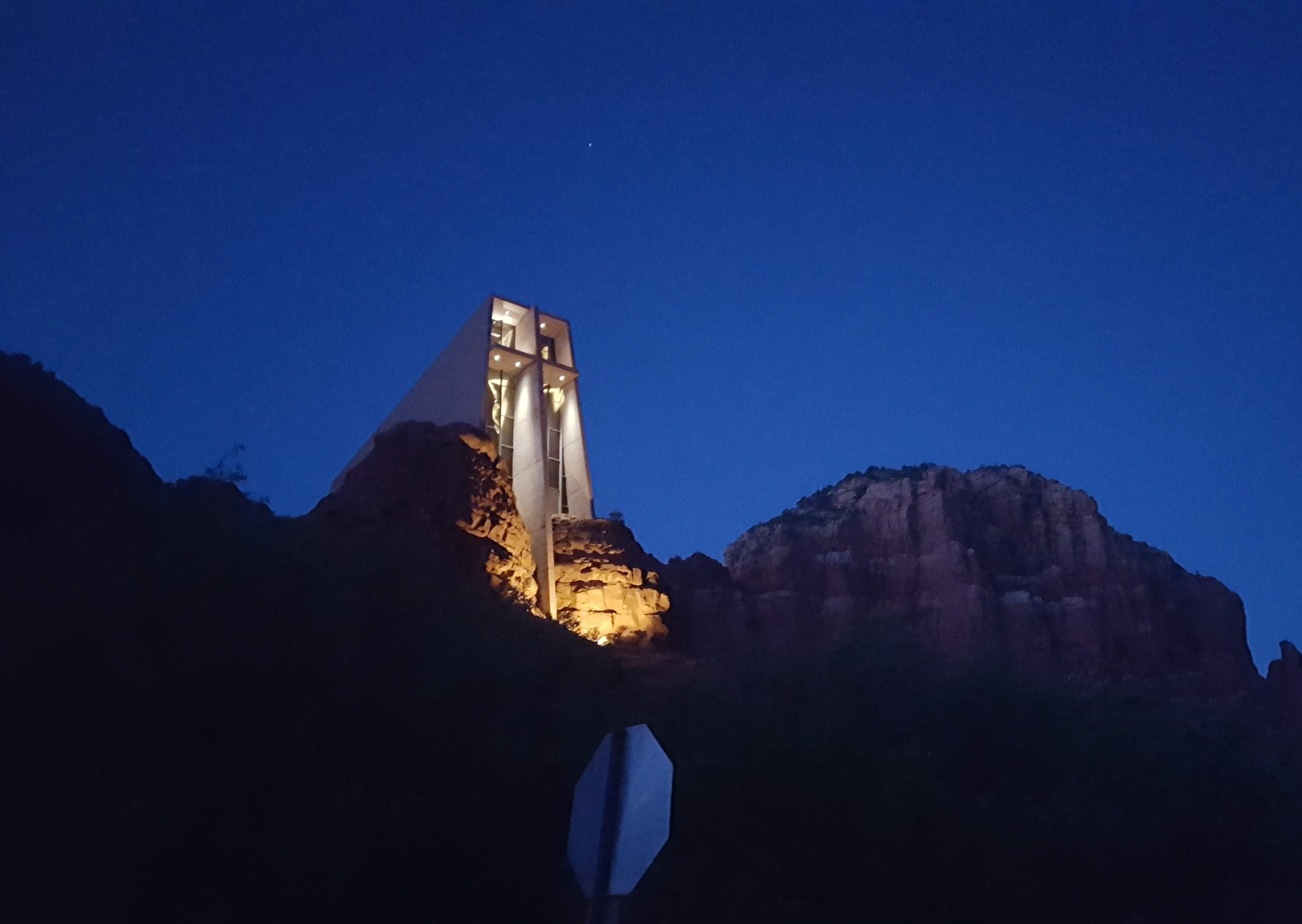
The chapel at night
