= Cricket (roofing) =

Water diversion feature on a roof

A cricket or saddle is a ridge structure designed to divert water on a roof around the high side of a large penetration, typically a skylight, equipment curb, or chimney. In some cases, a cricket can be used to transition from one roof area to another. On low-slope and flat roofs with parapet walls, crickets are commonly used to divert water to the drainage, against or perpendicular to the main roof slope.

The pitch of a cricket is sometimes the same as the rest of the roof, but not always. For steeply sloped roofs, it is most common to have the cricket pitch to be equal to or less than the main roof, however for low-slope or flat roofs, it is more common to see the cricket be at least 50% greater slope than the roof, to minimize ponding. Smaller crickets (on steep-slope roofs only) are covered with metal flashing, and larger ones can be covered with the same material as the rest of the roof.
