= Monta Loma, Mountain View =

Monta Loma Oakwood, Fairview, Mardell Manor
- Neighborhood
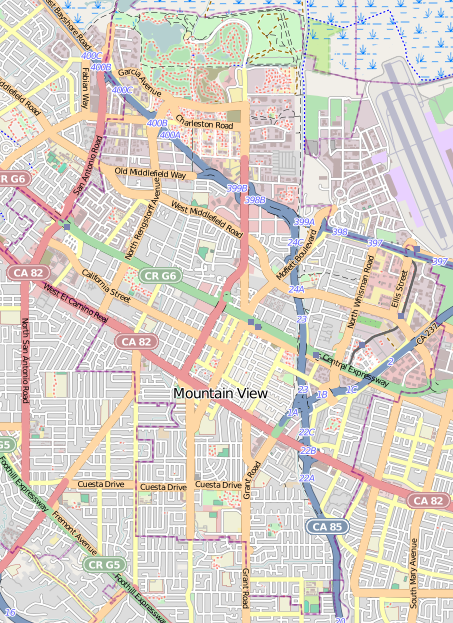
- Location within Mountain View, California Location within San Francisco Bay Area
- Coordinates: 37°24′34.7″N 122°05′57″W

Monta Loma is a neighborhood in Mountain View, California in the San Francisco Bay Area, located between the bounds of San Antonio Road, Middlefield Road, Rengstorff Avenue and Central Expressway.

This was the location of an Ohlone village and the Castro Indian Mound, one the largest shell mounds in the San Francisco Bay Area. After World War II, there was a housing boom, and this neighborhood's current housing was formed.

== History ==
=== Ohlone village and Castro Indian Mound ===
The first inhabits were the Ohlone Native Americans and the land from the current corner of Central Expressway and San Antonio Road was the Castro Indian Mound, also known as Indian Hill, Castro Shell Mound, and Secondino Robles. The mound measured 400 feet long, by 300 feet wide, and 10 feet high.

In 1893, Stanford University professors began to "investigate" the shell mound to better understand local Ohlone Native American customs. They discovered this was not only a place to dump cooking refuse but also a Native American burial ground. The Castro Indian Mound showed evidence of cremation and it's thought these cremations were only held for the social elite. The archeologists found a wide variety of items in the mound, including many oyster shells, fishing spears, pestles, jewelry, arrowheads, and among others. Radio carbon dating puts the origin of the Castro Mound around 1460 ± 100 B.C.

In 1947, the mound was leveled and demolished to sell it as topsoil for gardening.

In 1989, Stanford University surrendered the collected artifacts and remains from the Castro Shell Mound to their descendants, this includes the remains of 550 Ohlone people.

=== Post-World War II ===
The homes were built during the post-World War II housing boom, mostly California-style mid-century modern homes by Joseph Eichler, John Calder Mackay, and Mardell Building Company. Originally the neighborhood was named by each developer as they created sections, named "Oakwood" by Eichler, as well as "Fairview" by Eichler and "Mardell Manor" by Mardell Building Company.

From 1959 until 1967, a young Steve Jobs and his family lived on Diablo Avenue in Monta Loma and he attended the local elementary school.

The neighborhood has one of the best preserved tracts of Mackay homes.

==== Monta Loma Neighborhood Association ====
The Monta Loma Neighborhood Association (MLNA) was founded in 1977 and originally served as a "beautification committee". The MLNA hosts several annual neighborhood events, and serves to encourage dialog between the Mountain View city government and the neighbors.

== See also ==
- Greenmeadow, a nearby neighborhood
- John Calder Mackay
- Mayfield Mall, a nearby historical building
- Saint Athanasius Parish, a nearby historical church
