= Joseph Eichler =

American architect (1900–1974)

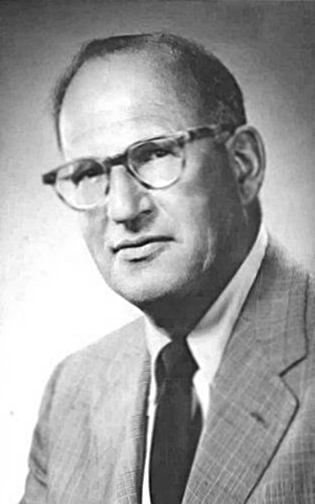
- Joseph Eichler in 1958
- Born: June 25, 1900; New York City, US
- Died: July 1, 1974 (aged 74); San Mateo County, California, US
- Education: New York University
- Occupation: Real estate developer
- Spouse: Lillian Moncharsh
- Children: 2

Joseph Leopold Eichler (June 25, 1900 – July 1, 1974) was a 20th-century post-war American real estate developer known for developing distinctive residential subdivisions of mid-century modern style tract housing in California. He was one of the influential advocates of bringing modern architecture from custom residences and large corporate buildings to general public availability. His company and developments remain in the Greater San Francisco Bay Area and Greater Los Angeles.

== Biography ==
Joseph Leopold Eichler was born on June 25, 1900, in New York City, and raised around Sutton Place, Manhattan, where his father and mother ran a small toy store, and in The Bronx. His father was Austrian and his mother was German, and he was raised traditional Jewish. Eichler attended New York University (NYU) and earned a business degree.

In 1925, the Eichler family moved to the San Francisco Bay Area, in order to work in the Moncharsh family wholesale butter and egg business Nye and Nisson, Inc, which closed by the mid-1940s. Regulators found Nye & Nissen was selling eggs that were outdated and incorrectly graded. Eichler's brother-in-law served six months to a year in jail.

For a few years in the mid 1940's, Eichler ran a retail store Peninsula Farmyard in Burlingame, California which sold poultry and eggs.

In 1943, Eichler rented the Sidney Bazett House in Hillsborough, California, a Usonian-style house built by Frank Lloyd Wright. Living in the Bazett house inspired Eichler to become a residential real estate developer of Modernist houses.

== Eichler Homes ==
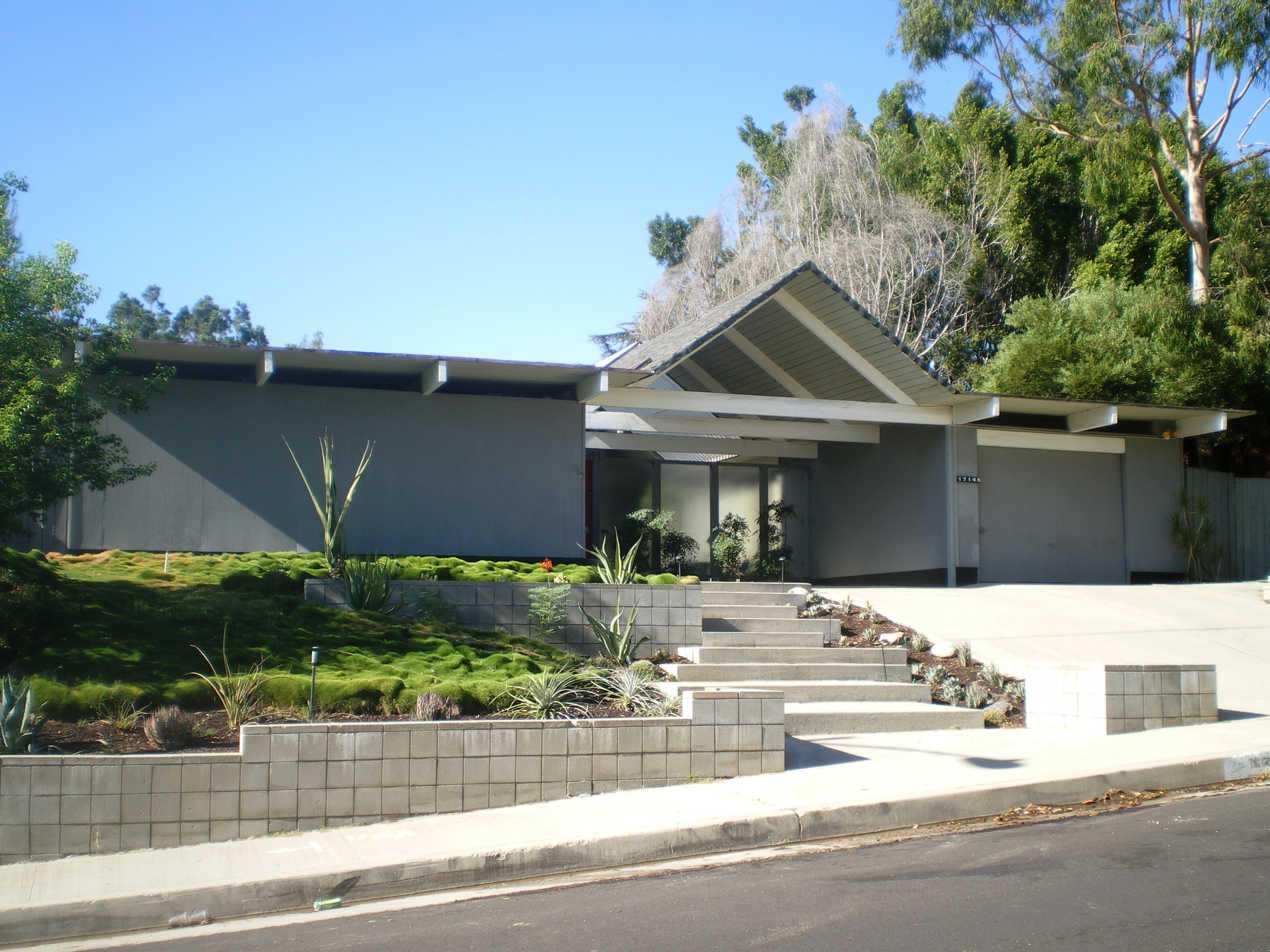
Foster Residence, Granada Hills

Between 1949 and 1966, Joseph Eichler's company, Eichler Homes, built more than 11,000 houses in nine communities in Northern California and houses in three communities in Southern California. Other firms worked with Eichler's company to build similar houses. Together, they all came to be known as Eichlers. During this period, Eichler became one of the nation's most influential builders of modern homes. The largest contiguous Eichler Homes development is "The Highlands" in San Mateo, built between 1956 and 1964.

Joseph Eichler was a social visionary who commissioned designs primarily for middle-class Americans. One of his stated aims was to construct inclusive and diverse planned communities, ideally featuring integrated parks and community centers. Eichler established a non-discrimination policy and offered homes for sale to anyone of any religion or race. In 1958, he resigned from the National Association of Home Builders when they refused to support a non-discrimination policy.

=== Design ===
According to his son, Eichler was inspired by a short period of time when the family lived in a Frank Lloyd Wright–designed house in Hillsborough. Eichler was attracted to the style and decided to try to produce similar designs. Joseph Eichler used well-known architects to design both the site plans and the houses themselves. He hired the respected architect and Wright disciple of sorts Robert Anshen of Anshen & Allen, who had designed mid century modern homes for other developers, to design the initial Eichlers. The first prototypes were built in 1949. In later years, Eichler built houses that were designed by other architects including by the San Francisco firm Claude Oakland & Associates and the Los Angeles firms of Jones & Emmons, A. Quincy Jones, and Raphael Soriano.

Eichler houses are examples of Modernist architecture that has come to be known as "California Modern", and typically feature glass walls, post-and-beam construction, unornamented exteriors, and open floorplans in a style made famous by Frank Lloyd Wright and Ludwig Mies van der Rohe. Eichler house exteriors featured flat and/or low-sloping A-framed roofs, vertical 2-inch pattern wood siding, and spartan facades with clean geometric lines. One of Eichler's signature concepts was to "bring the outside in", achieved via skylights and floor-to-ceiling windows with glass transoms looking out on protected and private outdoor rooms, patios, atriums, gardens, and swimming pools. Also of note is that most Eichler houses feature few, if any, front-facing (i.e., street-facing) windows; instead house fronts have either small, ceiling-level windows or small, rectangular windows with frosted glass. Many other architectural designs have large windows on all front-facing rooms.

The interiors had numerous unorthodox and innovative features for the time period including: exposed post-and-beam construction; tongue and groove decking for the ceilings following the roofline; concrete slab floors with integral radiant heating; lauan (Philippine mahogany) paneling; sliding doors for rooms, closets, and cabinets; and typically a second bathroom located in the master bedroom. Later models introduced the distinctive Eichler entry atriums, an open-air, enclosed entrance foyer designed to further advance the concept of integrating outdoor and indoor spaces.

Deck House designs, developed in Massachusetts beginning in 1959, have been compared with Eichler homes because both employed post-and-beam construction, expansive glazing, and tongue-and-groove roof decking.

Eichler houses were airy and modern in comparison to most of the mass-produced, middle-class, postwar houses built in the 1950s. At first, potential home buyers, many of whom were war-weary ex-servicemen and women seeking convention rather than innovation, were resistant to the innovative homes.

== Projects ==
The Northern California Eichler Homes are predominantly in San Francisco, Marin County, Sacramento, the East Bay towns of Walnut Creek, Castro Valley, Concord, Oakland, and the San Francisco Peninsula towns of San Mateo, Redwood City, Palo Alto, Sunnyvale, Mountain View and San Jose. The Southern California Eichler Homes developments are in Thousand Oaks, Granada Hills, Orange and Palm Springs.

=== Eichler Homes neighborhoods ===
==== Northern California ====
===== Alameda County =====
- Sequoyah Hills – Oakland, California, built between 1965 and 1966, there are fewer than 50 homes in Oakland Hills.
- Greenridge – Castro Valley, California, built along a ridge in the hills of Castro Valley, there are around 200 homes built by Joseph Eichler in the early to mid 1960s. Designed by Claude Oakland and Jones & Emmons, these homes feature a variety of floor plans from flat-top roofs to steeply pitched A-frames. Most of the homes feature the signature Eichler atrium along with floor-to-ceiling walls of glass and exposed post and beams. Most Greenridge homes have views with some having views of the east bay city lights and the bay.

===== Contra Costa County =====
- Concord, California – Three Eichler tracts (Rancho Del Diablo, Rancho Los Santos, and Parkwood Estates) consisting of approximately 175 homes built between 1963 and 1964
- Rancho San Miguel – Walnut Creek, California, a neighborhood with more than 300 Eichler homes

===== Marin County =====
- Lucas Valley and Marinwood – Marin County, California
- The Terra Linda section – San Rafael, California
- Strawberry Point section - Mill Valley, California

===== Sacramento County =====
- South Land Park and South Land Park Hills neighborhoods in Sacramento, California – with many Eichler homes and a street named Eichler Street. Around 140 Eichler homes were originally planned in South Land Park Hills. 60 were finished and approximately 55 remain.

===== Santa Clara County =====
- Monta Loma Neighborhood – Mountain View, California with 200 Eichler homes from 1954 in a tract, this is also a location with other mid-century home builders, Mackay Homes and Mardell Homes.
- Stanford University – Stanford, California, about 100 homes on Stanford land north of Page Mill Road and east of Junipero Serra Blvd.
- Palo Alto has more Eichler homes than any other city. Midtown – South Palo Alto, California, with many Eichler Homes, features a Swim and Tennis Club called "Eichler" on Louis Road just south of Greer Road. In south Palo Alto lies Greenmeadow, a tract planned and designed by Jones and Emmons, with landscaping by Thomas Church, recognized by the National Register of Historic Places, which created the Eichler Tract Community Association and Aquatic Facility called "Greenmeadow".
- Sereno Foothills, Monte Sereno, California with 16 Eichler homes. Eight were built in 1969 and 8 built in 1970. This small tract was completed by J.L. Eichler and Associates (successor firm to Eichler Homes).
- Bell Meadows – Mountain View, California, 48 Eichler homes built from 1972 to 1973, near Trophy Drive
- Sunnymount Gardens – Sunnyvale, California, the first Eichlers built in 1949–1950.
- Fairgrove Tract – Cupertino, California has 229 homes built in 1960–1961
- Fairwood, Fairbrae, and Fairbrae addition – Sunnyvale, California have 400+ homes built between 1958 and 1961
- Fairglen Additions in the Willow Glen neighborhood – San Jose, California
- Morepark Neighborhood (currently called Rose Glen / Sherman Oaks) Willow Glen – San Jose, California
- Clay Drive – Los Altos, California
- Pomeroy West – Santa Clara, California, with 138 Eichler homes in a condo community.
- Pomeroy Green – Santa Clara, California, with 78 attached two story Eichler townhomes in a cooperative community.

===== San Francisco County =====
- Diamond Heights neighborhood – San Francisco, California.

===== San Mateo County =====
- 19th Avenue Park – San Mateo, California
- The Highlands – San Mateo, California - with over 700 Eichlers, this is the largest contiguous development of Eichler homes; it also includes the experimental X-100 steel house.
- Bay Vista, Treasure Isle, and Marina Point Neighborhoods – Foster City, California, three separate neighborhoods that are all in proximity to each other and feature Eichler homes intermixed with other types of architecture. Bay Vista is the largest tract in Foster City.
- Mills Estates – Burlingame, California
- Atherwood – Redwood City, California
- Ladera - Ladera, California - with 25 Eichlers built during 1951 using architectural designs by Jones & Emmons

==== Southern California ====
- "Eichler Homes In Conejo Village" and Expo/West – Thousand Oaks, California, with 103 Eichler homes in the "Eichler Homes In Conejo Village" tract, built between 1964 and 1966. The newer portion of the development was marketed as Expo/West.
- Balboa Highlands – Granada Hills, California, with 109 Eichler homes in an Eichler community in the San Fernando Valley; There are a number of homes in this neighborhood that retain their original details. The "Harris Residence" and the "Foster Residence" are designated Los Angeles Historic-Cultural Monuments.
- Fairhaven – Orange, California, with 140 Eichler homes.
- Fairmeadow – Orange, California, with 123 Eichler homes.
- Fairhills – Orange, California, with 80 Eichler homes.
- Palm Springs, California in the southernmost Andreas Hills neighborhood – building started in 2015 based on Eichler's blueprints, built by KUD Development.

=== Other projects ===
Joseph Eichler also built semi-custom designs for individual clients by commission. There are also three Eichlers built as the first houses of an aborted tract in the mid-1960s in Chestnut Ridge, New York. As a result of soaring land prices in the mid-1960s urban redevelopment projects became popular, and Eichler began building low- and high-rise projects in San Francisco's Western Addition and Visitacion Valley, San Francisco districts, a luxury high-rise, the Summit (a.k.a. the Eichler Summit) on Russian Hill and row houses on Diamond Heights. He also developed the suburban and trendsetting co-op communities Pomeroy Green and Pomeroy West in Santa Clara. These large projects began to overextend the company, and by the mid-1960s, Eichler Homes was in financial distress. The company filed for bankruptcy in 1967.

== Personal life ==
In 1925, he married Lilian Moncharsh, the daughter of Polish Jewish immigrants. Together they had two sons, Edward "Ned" Philip (1930–2014) and Richard Lionel Eichler (1928–1998).

== Sources ==
- Adamson, Paul; Marty, Arbunich (2002). Eichler: Modernism Rebuilds the American Dream. Ernest Braun (photographer). Layton, Utah: Gibbs Smith Publishers. ISBN 1-58685-184-5.
- Adamson, Paul (March 2001). "California modernism and the Eichler homes". The Journal of Architecture. 6 (1): 1–25. doi:10.1080/13602360010024804. S2CID 110272707.
- Ditto, Jerry; Lanning, Stern (1995). Design for Living: Eichler Homes. Marvin Wax (photographer). San Francisco: Chronicle Books. ISBN 0-8118-0846-7.
- Jacobs, Karrie (May 15, 2005). "Saving the Tract House". The New York Times Magazine.
