= Anshen & Allen =

International architectural firm founded in San Francisco in 1940

Anshen and Allen Architects
- Type: Private
- Industry: Architecture
- Founded: 1940; San Francisco, California
- Founder: Bob Anshen; Steve Allen
- Headquarters: San Francisco, California, USA
- Number of locations: 4 offices (2010)
- Area served: Worldwide
- Key people: Roger Swanson, CEO
- Website: Anshen.com

Anshen and Allen was an international architecture, planning and design firm headquartered in San Francisco with offices in Boston, Columbus, and London. The firm was ranked eighth for sustainable practices, and nineteenth overall in the "Architect 50" published by Architect magazine in 2010. They also ranked twenty-eighth in the top "100 Giants" of Interior Design 2010.

== History ==
Anshen and Allen was founded by Samuel Robert "Bob" Anshen (1910-1964) and William Stephen "Steve" Allen Jr. (1912-1992) in San Francisco in 1940. Anshen was born in Revere, Massachusetts, in 1910 to Louis Joseph Anshen and Sarah Jaffee, both of whom were Jewish immigrants from Eastern Europe. At the time of his birth, they owned a jewelry shop and were prosperous enough to afford a servant. Allen was born in Neptune Township, New Jersey, in 1912.

Their relationship began while they were studying at the University of Pennsylvania School of Architecture. Upon graduation, they both received a traveling fellowship that eventually led them to San Francisco in 1937.

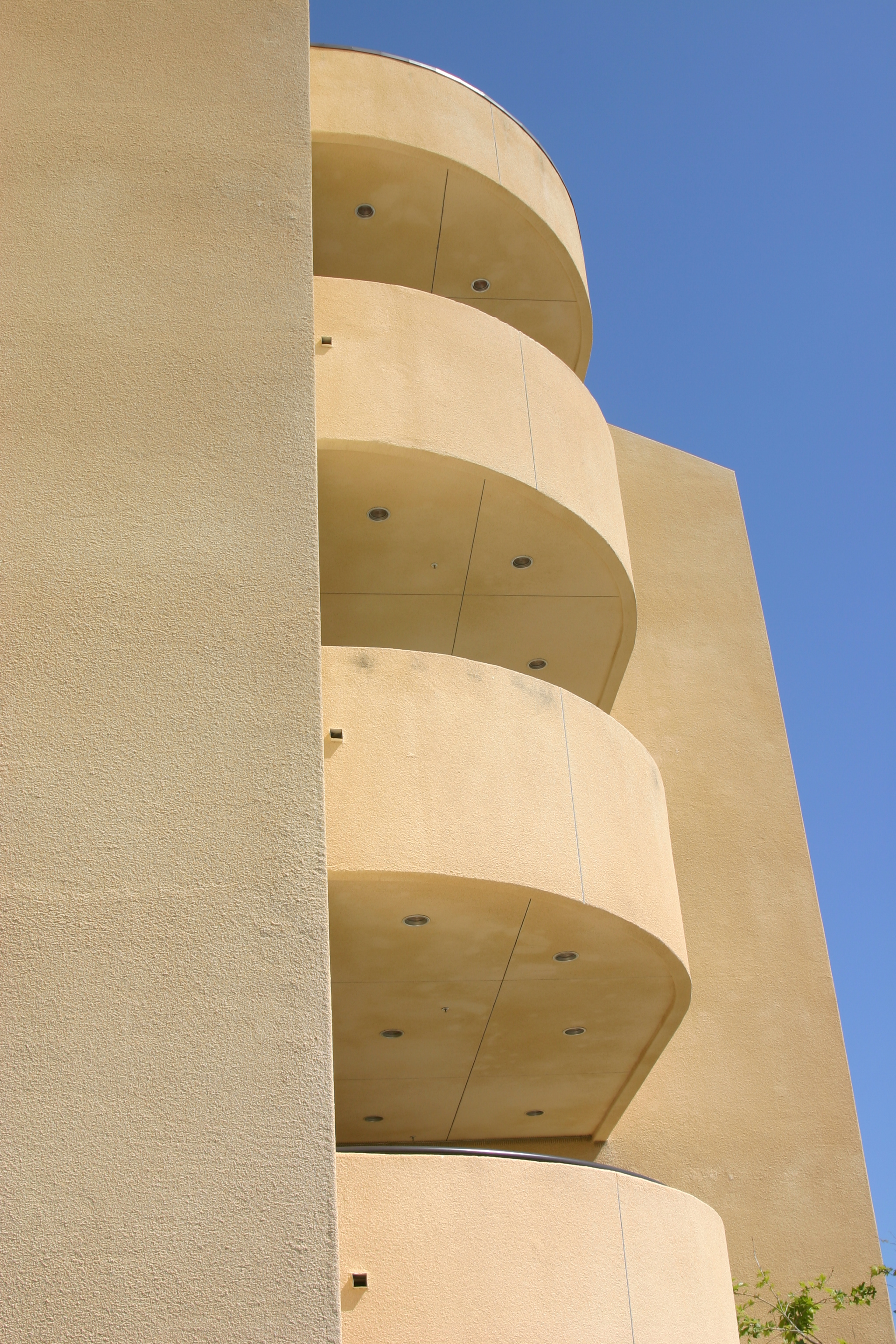
Keck Science Center at Pepperdine University, designed by Anshen and Allen

Their first project was the Davies House, a 6,000-square-foot (560 m^{2}) Tudor Gothic inspired mansion in Woodside, California, commissioned by Ralph K. Davies, a senior vice-president of Standard Oil of California. The house was completed on November 30, 1941. After the end of World War II, as a generalist practice, the firm developed gas station prototypes for Standard Oil, parking garages and interior naval architecture.

Elmer Gavello, Joseph Eichler and John Calder Mackay, residential real estate developers, commissioned Anshen and Allen to build the initial Gavello homes, Eichler homes and Mackay Homes in the California Modernist style beginning in the 1950s. The firm continued to design tract housing and custom homes until 1962.

In the late 1970s and early 1980s, under the leadership of Derek Parker, the firm was transformed into a modern international architectural practice.

During the mid-2000s, Anshen and Allen adopted the use of Building Information Modeling (BIM). In 2007, Anshen and Allen participated in the development of Integrated Project Delivery by serving on the IPD Definition Task Group of the American Institute of Architects (AIA) California Council.

Anshen and Allen used shipping containers in their design for clinics for Containers 2 Clinics (C2C), a nonprofit organization that provides access to healthcare for women and children in rural areas.

In 2009 the firm was identified as specializing in sustainable designs for the healthcare and academic markets.

Anshen and Allen was acquired by Stantec in 2010.

== Legacy ==
The Anshen and Allen papers are kept in the Environmental Design Archives at the University of California, Berkeley.

== Selected projects ==
- 1950: Various mid-century modern aka "California Modern" homes, including the Gavello and Eichler developments Bay Area, California
- 1956: Chapel of the Holy Cross, Sedona, Arizona, United States
- 1957: Quarry Visitor Center, Dinosaur National Monument, Utah (razed)
- 1961: 601 California Street, San Francisco, California
- 1963: University of California, Berkeley, Latimer Hall, Berkeley, California
- 1964: Central United Methodist Church, Stockton, California
- 1965: Good Samaritan Hospital, San Jose, California
- 1966: University of California, Berkeley, Samuel Silver Space Sciences Laboratory, Berkeley, California
- 1966: University of California, Berkeley, Hildebrand Hall, Berkeley, California
- 1967: Bank of California Building, San Francisco, California
- 1968: University of California, Berkeley, Lawrence Hall of Science, Berkeley, California
- 1969: Bank of California Tower (now Union Bank Tower), Portland, Oregon
- 1987: University of Nevada System - Claude Howard Administration Building; Reno, Nevada
- 1988: Clovis Community Hospital, Clovis, California
- 1991: Stanford University Medical Center, Lucile Packard Children's Hospital, Palo Alto, California
- 1993: Stanford University, Green Earth Sciences Building, Palo Alto, California
- 1993: University of California, Berkeley, Tang Center - Health Services Building, Berkeley, California
- 1994: Children's Hospital, Ambulatory Services Building, Oakland, California
- 1994: Stanford University, Landau Center for Economics and Policy Research, Palo Alto, California
- 1998: Oregon Health and Science University, Doernbecher Children's Hospital, Portland, Oregon
- 1998: Stanford University, Alway Building Genetics Department Lab, Palo Alto, California
- 1999: Santa Clara Valley Medical Center Main Hospital and Specialty Center, San Jose, California
- 1999: King's College, New Hunt's House, London, United Kingdom
- 1999: Beijing Hospital, Inpatient Pavilion, Beijing, China
- 2000: King's College, Franklin-Wilkins Building, London, United Kingdom
- 2000: Seattle Children's, Pediatric and Infant Intensive Care Unit, Seattle, Washington
- 2001: University of California, San Francisco Medical Center, Ambulatory Care Center, Radiology Clinic and Pediatrics Clinic, San Francisco, California
- 2002: Norfolk and Norwich University Hospital, Norwich, United Kingdom
- 2002: Asian Hospital and Medical Center, Filinvest, Alabang, Philippines
- 2002: MESA Industries, MESA Women's Health Center, Ankara, Turkey
- 2002: Diablo Valley College, Business and Language Building, Pleasant Hill, California
- 2002: University of Kentucky, Ralph G. Anderson Engineering Building, Lexington, Kentucky
- 2002: University of California, Berkeley, Hildebrand and Latimer Hall Seismic Upgrades, Berkeley, California
- 2002: University of California, Davis, Contained Research Facility, Davis, California
- 2003: Intermountain Healthcare, Dixie Regional Medical Center, St. George, Utah
- 2003: Contra Costa County Regional Medical Center, Ambulatory Care Center, Martinez, California
- 2003: California State University, Monterey Bay, Chapman Science Academic Center, Seaside, California
- 2003: Occidental College, Hameetman Science Center, Los Angeles, California
- 2004: Great Ormond Street Hospital for Children, New Botnar Building, London, United Kingdom
- 2004: Great Ormond Street Hospital for Children, Weston House - Patient Hospital and Education Center, London, United Kingdom
- 2004: Harvard University School of Dental Medicine, Research and Education Building, Boston, Massachusetts
- 2004: University of Missouri, Life Sciences Center, Columbia, Missouri
- 2004: De Anza College, Science Center, Cupertino, California
- 2004: Royal Manchester Children's Hospital, Manchester, United Kingdom
- 2005: University of Cambridge, Hutchison Cancer Research Centre, Cambridge, United Kingdom
- 2006: Meyer Children's Hospital, Florence, Italy
- 2006: University of Manchester, Sir Henry Wellcome Manchester Interdisciplinary Biocentre, Manchester, United Kingdom
- 2006: University of California, Santa Cruz, Physical Sciences Building, Santa Cruz, California
- 2006: University of North Carolina, Chapel Hill, Michael Hooker Research Center, Chapel Hill, North Carolina
- 2006: University of Utah, Warnock Engineering Building, Salt Lake City, Utah
- 2007: Kaiser Permanente Santa Clara Medical Center, Santa Clara, California
- 2007: Fenway Community Health Center, Health Clinic, Boston, Massachusetts
- 2007: Intermountain Healthcare, Intermountain Medical Center, Murray, Utah
- 2008: PeaceHealth, Sacred Heart Medical Center at RiverBend, Springfield, Oregon
- 2009: Newcastle upon Tyne Hospitals, Royal Victoria Infirmary, Newcastle, United Kingdom
- 2009: Stanford Hospitals & Clinics, Outpatient Center, Redwood City, California
- 2009: City and County of San Francisco Department of Health, Laguna Honda Hospital Expansion, San Francisco, California
- 2009: Palomar Pomerado Health, Palomar Medical Center and Pomerado Hospital, San Diego, California
- 2010: Mills-Peninsula Health Services, Peninsula Medical Center, Burlingame, California
- 2015: University of California, San Francisco Medical Center, Mission Bay Campus, San Francisco, California (Under construction)

== Awards ==
- Concrete Masonry Design Award, 2005
- Building Design & Construction Best AEC Firms to Work For, 2007
- Camden Building Quality Awards for Large Commercial - Octav Botnar Wing, Great Ormond Street Hospital, 2007
- Interior Design Best of Year Merit Award for Healthcare - Jon & Karen Huntsman Cancer Center, Intermountain Medical Center, 2007
- Interior Design Best of Year Merit Award for Education - Sir Henry Wellcome Manchester Interdisciplinary Biocentre, 2007
- International Interior Design Association Northern California Chapter Honor Award - Sir Henry Wellcome Manchester Interdisciplinary Biocentre, 2008
- Building Better Health Care Award for Best International Design - Intermountain Medical Center, 2008
- Building Better Health Care Award for Best Hospital Design - Northern Centre for Cancer Care and Renal Services Centre, The Freeman Hospital, 2008
- Building Better Health Care Judge's Special Award Highly Commended - The Bexley Wing, St. James's Institute of Oncology, St. James University Hospital, 2008
- U.S. Green Building Council's LEED Silver Certification for Columbus Office, 2009.
- American Society of Healthcare Engineering Vista Award for New Construction - Sacred Heart Medical Center at Riverbend, 2009
- Healthcare Environment Award for Ambulatory Care Facilities - Stanford Medicine Outpatient Center, 2010
