= 1934 in architecture =

The year 1934 in architecture involved some significant architectural events and new buildings.

== Events ==
- The Architects (Registration) Act, 1934, is passed in the United Kingdom; the legislation is eventually superseded by a new Act in 1997.
- Narkomtiazhprom stage a design contest for construction of a People's Commissariat of Construction of Heavy Industry in Red Square, Moscow in the Soviet Union.

== Buildings and structures ==
=== Buildings opened ===
- May – Penguin Pool, London Zoo, designed by Berthold Lubetkin and Ove Arup.
- July 9 – Isokon building (Lawn Road flats), Hampstead, London, designed by Wells Coates.
- July 17 – Circular Manchester Central Library, England, designed by Vincent Harris; foundation stone for same architect's adjacent Manchester Town Hall Extension is laid on same day.
- October 23 – Guildhall, Swansea, Wales, designed by Percy Thomas.
- October 24 – Palazzo delle Poste, Palermo, Sicily, Italy, designed by Angiolo Mazzoni.
- November 24 – ANZAC War Memorial in Sydney, Australia, designed by Bruce Dellit.

=== Buildings completed ===
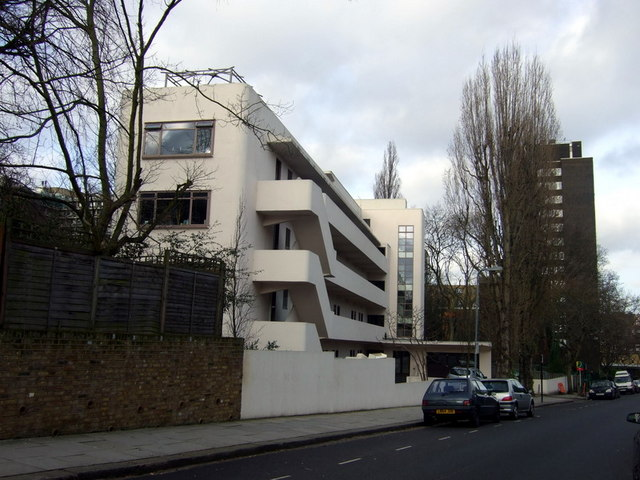
Isokon building in Hampstead, London, UK

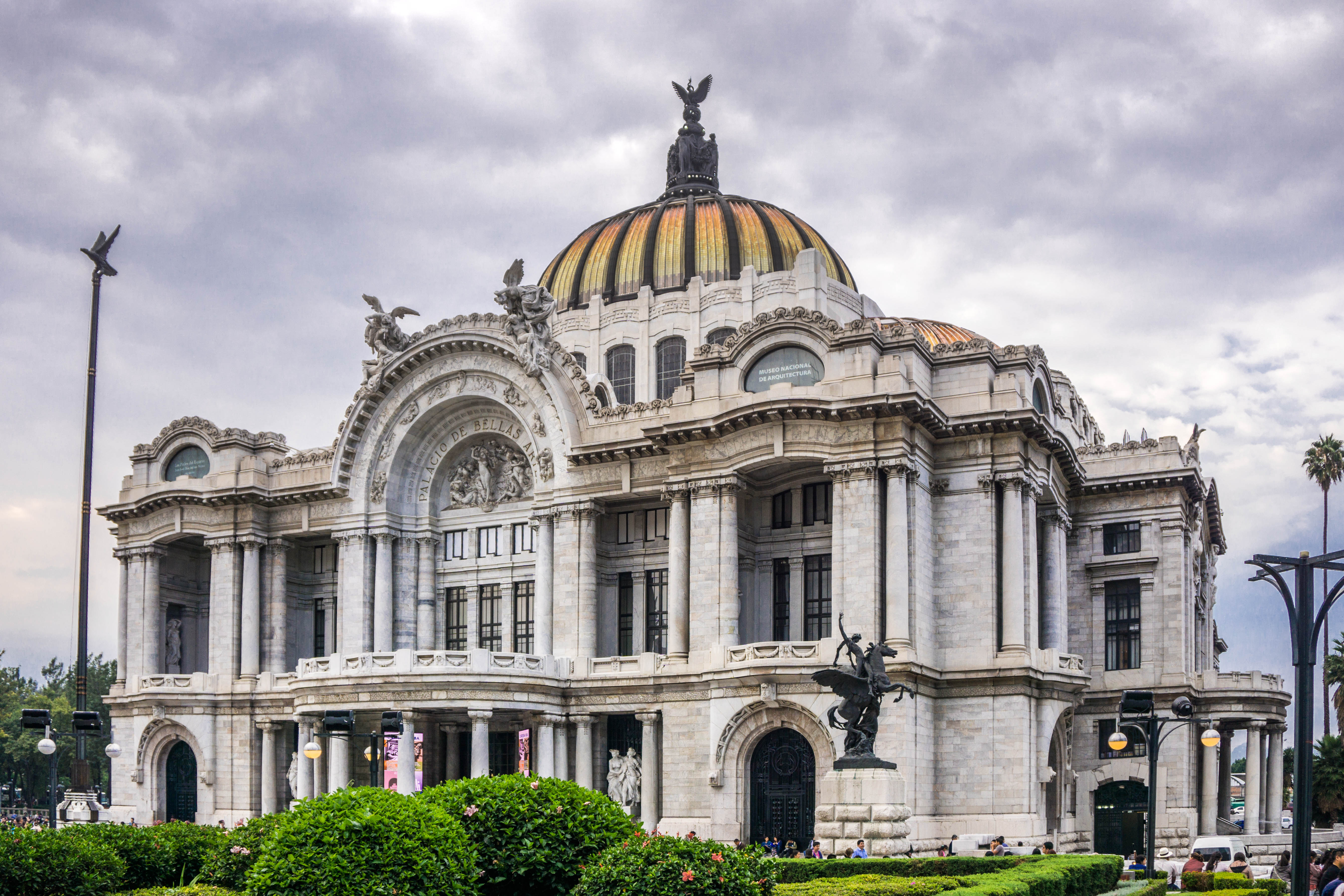
Palacio de Bellas Artes in Mexico City, Mexico

- Gothenburg City Theatre, Sweden.
- 2 Holden Street, Kensington Park, Adelaide. Built by Philip Claridge for Don Bradman as his personal residence.
- 64 Heath Drive, Gidea Park, London, designed by Francis Skinner of Tecton Group.
- Cholmeley Lodge (apartments), Highgate, London, designed by Guy Morgan.
- Samuel Goldwyn Estate, Beverly Hills, California, by Douglas Honnold and George Vernon Russell
- Drapacz Chmur ("Silesian Skyscraper") apartment building, Katowice, Poland, designed by architect Tadeusz Kozłowski and structural engineer Stefan Bryła.
- Helsingborg Concert Hall, designed by Sven Markelius.
- Synagogue (Agudat Achim) at Skořepka 13, Brno, designed by Otto Eisler.
- New Cambridge University Library (October 22) and Memorial Court for Clare College, Cambridge, designed as an ensemble, and buildings in North Court, Trinity Hall, Cambridge, England, all by Giles Gilbert Scott.
- Tongland Generating Station, Galloway hydro-electric power scheme, Scotland, designed by Sir Alexander Gibb & Partners.
- Palacio de Bellas Artes, Mexico City, designed by Federico Mariscal.
- Fronton Recoletos, Madrid, designed by Eduardo Torroja.
- Joyería J. Roca (modern-day Tous) at 18, Paseo de Gracia, and Ciutat de Repòs i de Vacances, both in Barcelona and designed by Josep Lluís Sert.
- 57 Ahad Ha'am Street, White City (Tel Aviv), Mandatory Palestine, designed by Genia Averbuch.

== Publication ==
- Steen Eiler Rasmussen – London, the Unique City

== Awards ==
- RIBA Royal Gold Medal – Henry Vaughan Lanchester.
- Grand Prix de Rome, architecture: André Hilt.

== Births ==
- January 4 – Zurab Tsereteli, Georgian-Russian painter, sculptor and architect, President of the Russian Academy of Arts
- March 30 – Hans Hollein, Austrian architect and designer
- April 8 – Kisho Kurokawa, Japanese architect and one of the founders of the Metabolist Movement (died 2007)
- June 21 – John Outram, English architect
- July 9 – Michael Graves, US architect, one of The New York Five
- September 11 – Cedric Price, English architect (died 2003)
- September 30 – Marco Dezzi Bardeschi, Italian architect (died 2018)
- October 12 – Richard Meier, US Rationalist architect
- November 6 – Barton Myers, US-Canadian architect and teacher
- Nari Gandhi, Indian architect (died 1993)

== Deaths ==
- March 7 – Henry Wilson, English Arts and Crafts architect and metalwork designer (born 1864)
- May 17 – Cass Gilbert, US Beaux Arts architect (born 1859)
- August 12 – Hendrik Petrus Berlage, Dutch architect (born 1856)
- August 14 – Raymond Hood, US Art Deco architect (born 1881)
- August 18 – Sir John Sulman, Australian architect (born 1849)
- October 4 – Henry Sproatt, Canadian architect (born 1866)
- November 27 – Arthur Beresford Pite, English architect (born 1861)
