= 1864 in architecture =

The year 1864 in architecture involved some significant architectural events and new buildings.

== Events ==
- Martin & Chamberlain begin their partnership in Birmingham, England.
- December 8 – The Clifton Suspension Bridge in Bristol, England, designed by Isambard Kingdom Brunel in 1831 and completed as a memorial to him by William Henry Barlow and John Hawkshaw, is opened to traffic. For the occasion, it is lit by magnesium flares but they are blown out by the wind.

== Buildings and structures ==
=== Buildings opened ===
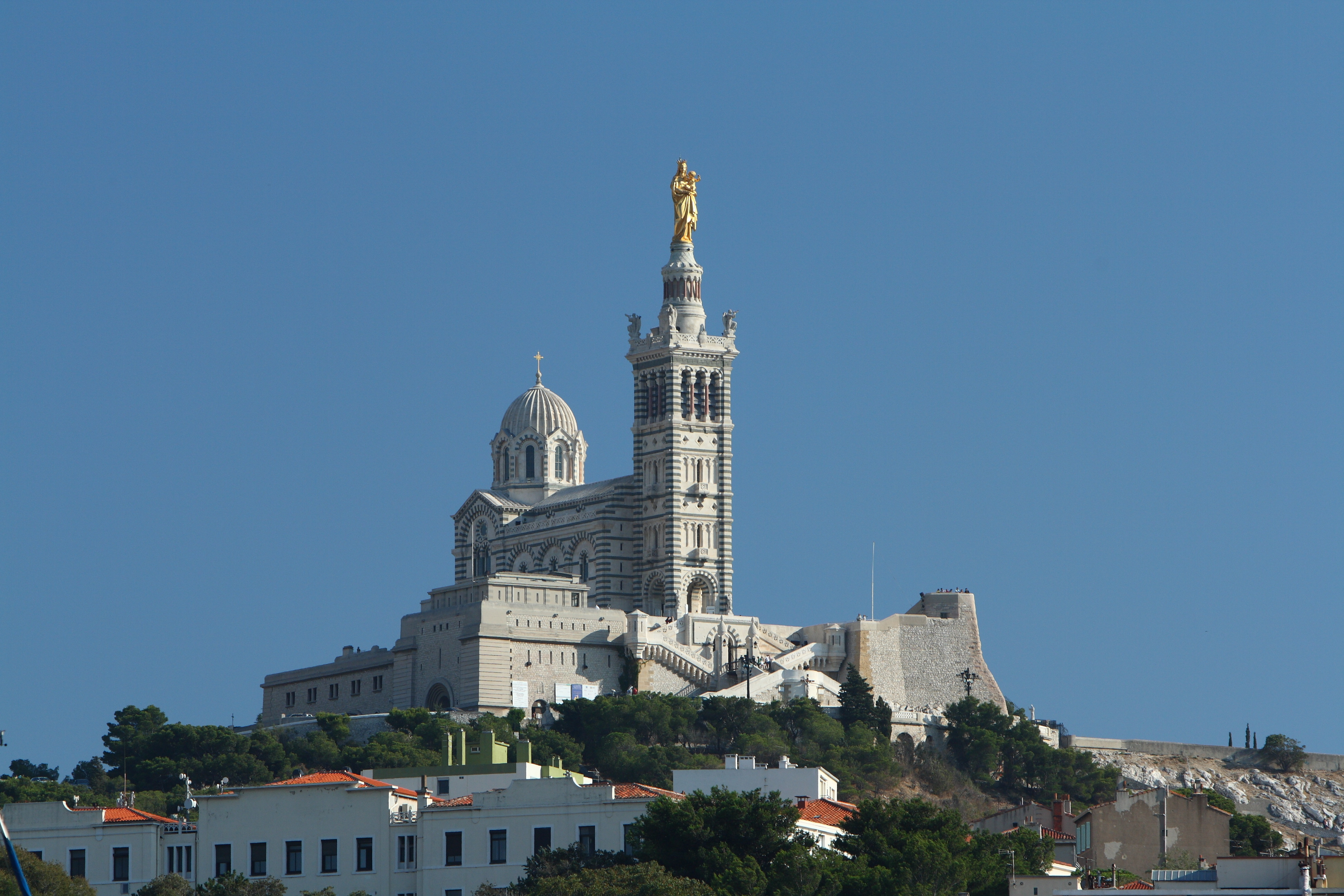
Notre-Dame de la Garde

- June 5 – Notre-Dame de la Garde, Marseille, France, designed by Henri-Jacques Espérandieu (consecrated).
- June 23 – Grande synagogue de Lyon, France, designed by Abraham Hirsch.

=== Buildings completed ===
- St Peter's Church, Vauxhall, London, designed by John Loughborough Pearson.
- Northampton Guildhall in England, designed by E. W. Godwin.
- Oriel Chambers, Liverpool, England, the world's first metal-framed glass curtain walled building, designed by Peter Ellis.
- Bridge No. 28 ("Gothic Bridge"), Central Park, New York City, designed by Calvert Vaux.

=== Buildings demolished ===
- November to December – Las Incantadas, a Roman monument in Thessalonica, dismantled by Emmanuel Miller while attempting to transfer it to France.

== Awards ==
- RIBA Royal Gold Medal – Eugène Viollet-le-Duc.
- Grand Prix de Rome, architecture: Julien Guadet and Arthur Dutert.

== Births ==
- March 12 – Henry Wilson, English architect and metalwork designer (died 1934)
- July 12 – Carl Harald Brummer, Danish architect (died 1953)
- June 10 – Ninian Comper, Scottish-born Gothic Revival architect (died 1960)

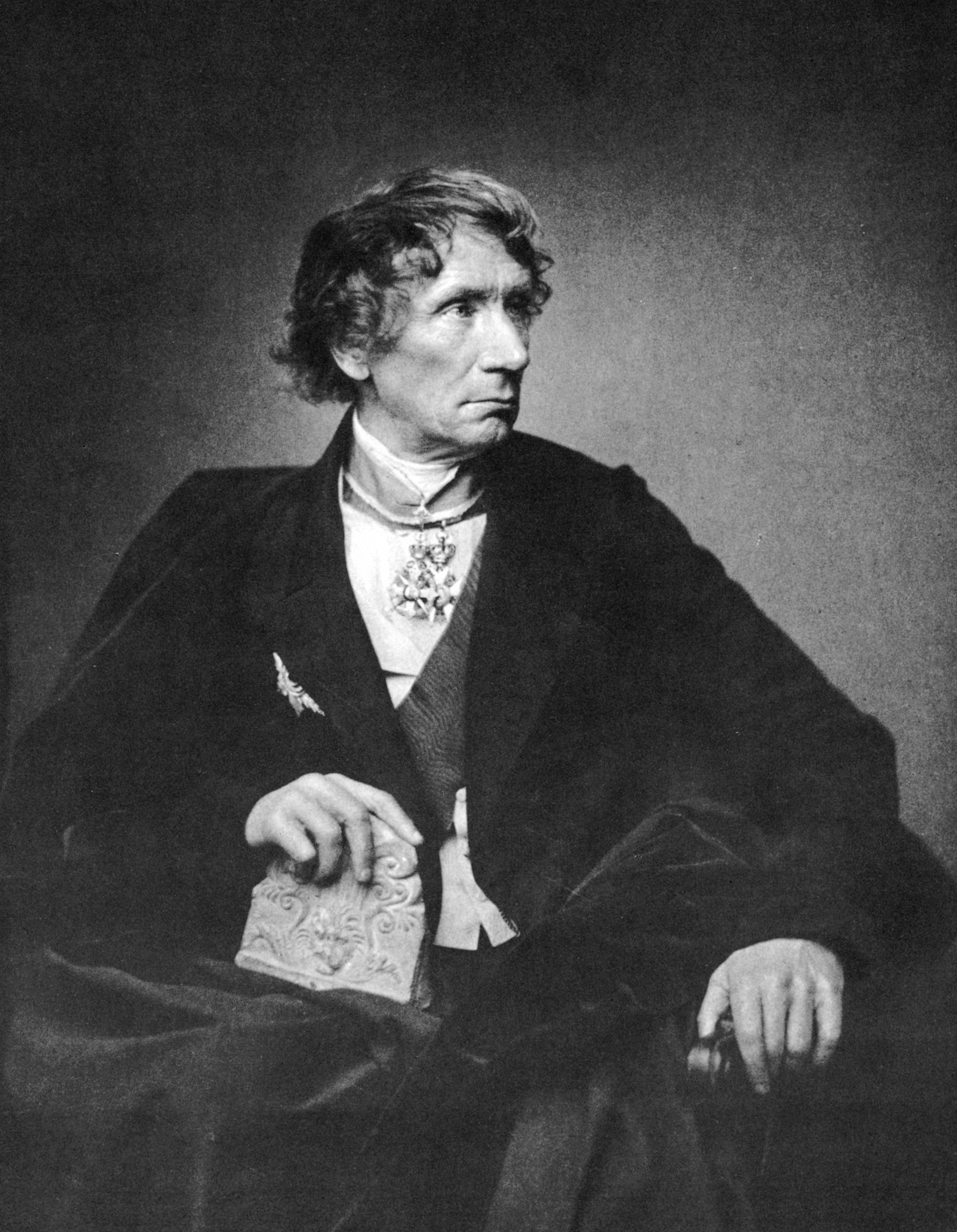
Leo von Klenze

- September 4 – William B. Ittner, American architect based in St Louis (died 1936)
- November 4 – Robert Lorimer, Scottish architect and furniture designer (died 1929)
- December 21 – Ernest Gimson, English architect and furniture designer (died 1919)

== Deaths ==
- January 10 – Patrick Byrne, Irish church architect (born 1783)
- January 26 – Leo von Klenze, German Neoclassicist architect (born 1784)
- date unknown – Thomas Mainwaring Penson, English surveyor and architect (born 1818)
