= 1950 in architecture =

The year 1950 in architecture involved some significant architectural events and new buildings.

== Events ==
- The Alas Building, Buenos Aires, Argentina, is commissioned by President Juan Perón for the Association of Unionized Latin American Workers (ATLAS, S.A.). It will be the tallest building in Buenos Aires from its completion until 1996, when it is surpassed by the Le Parc tower.
- Frank Lloyd Wright completes construction of several Usonian style houses across the United States, including
  - John D. Haynes House in Fort Wayne, Indiana.
  - Fountainhead (J. Willis Hughes House) in Jackson, Mississippi.
  - Thomas Keys Residence in Rochester, Minnesota.
  - Richard C. Smith House in Jefferson, Wisconsin.
  - J.A. Sweeton Residence in Cherry Hill, New Jersey.
- The Larkin Administration Building in Buffalo, New York, United States, designed by Frank Lloyd Wright in 1904, is demolished, despite widespread protests.
- The original golden Kinkaku-ji temple in Kyoto, Japan, originating in the 14th century, is destroyed by arson (July 2).
- The Salutation, Sandwich, Kent, England, a house designed by Edwin Lutyens and built 1911–12, becomes a Grade I listed building in the United Kingdom.

== Buildings and structures ==
=== Buildings opened ===
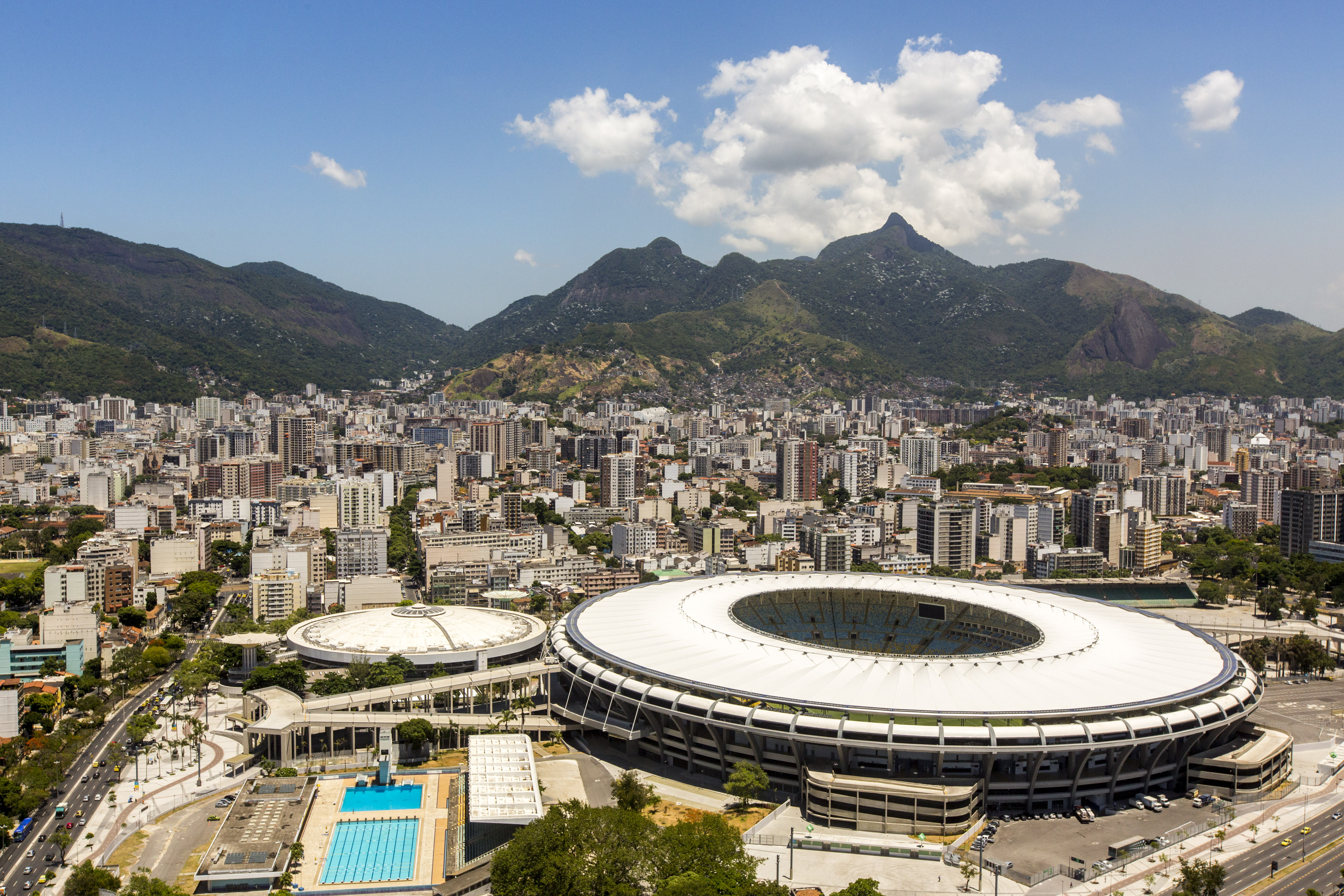
Estádio do Maracanã in Rio de Janeiro, Brazil

- June 16 – Estádio do Maracanã, Rio de Janeiro, Brazil, built to accommodate the 1950 FIFA World Cup.
- November 7 – Árpád Bridge, Budapest, Hungary, designed in 1939 by János Kossalka and opened as Sztálin híd.
- date unknown – Hyart Theater, built in Lovell, Wyoming, by Hyrum "Hy" Bischoff.

=== Buildings completed ===
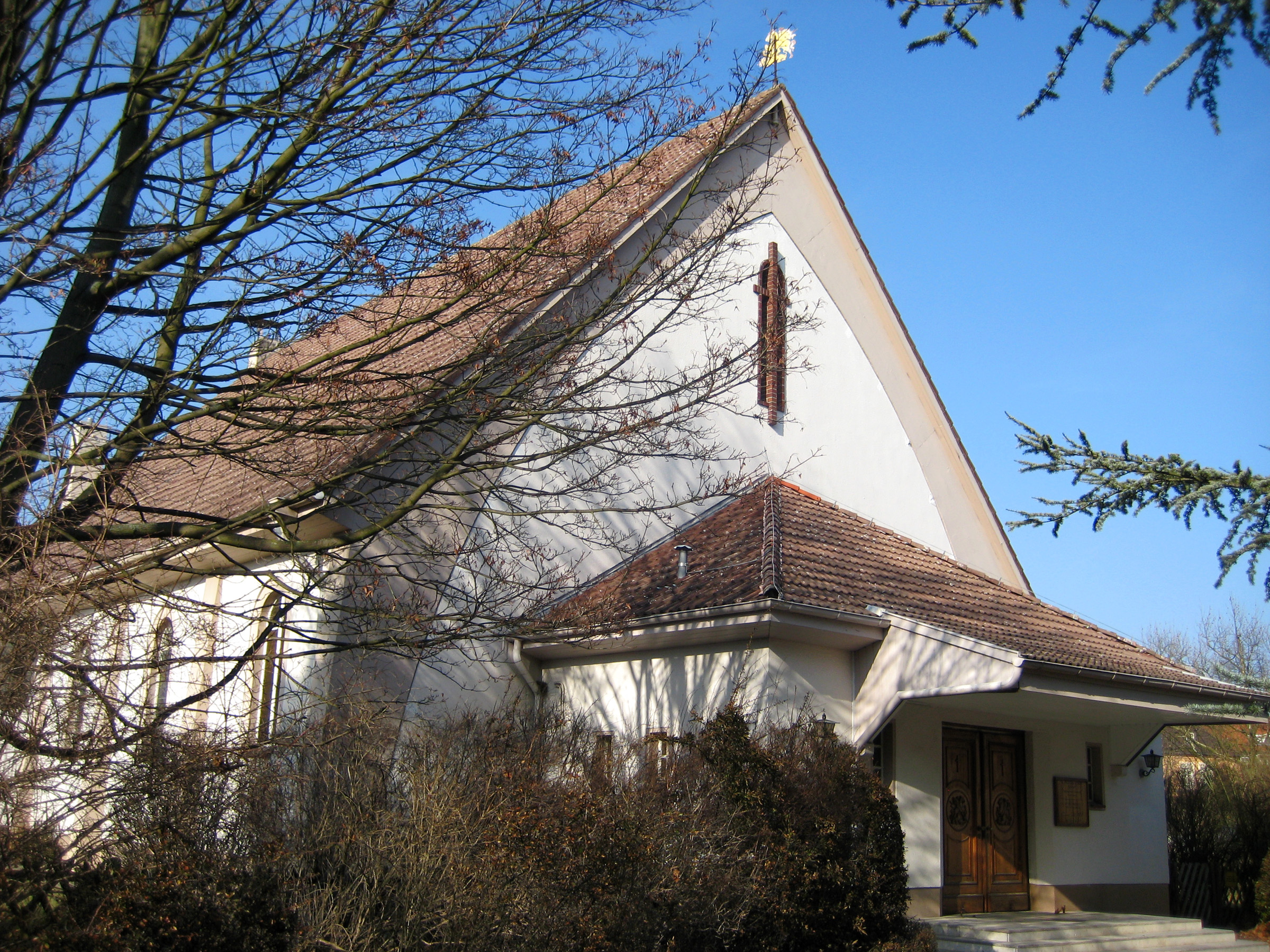
St. George's Anglican Church in Berlin, Germany

- Alsancak Hocazade Mosque (Alsancak Hocazade Camii), İzmir, Turkey.
- The Barn (Los Angeles), designed by A. Quincy Jones as a home and office for himself.
- Rockefeller Guest House in Manhattan, designed by Philip Johnson.
- Rose Seidler House, Sydney, Australia, designed by Harry Seidler for his mother.
- Blažo Jovanović Bridge, Podgorica, Montenegro, designed by Branko Žeželj.
- Eames House (pictured) in Santa Monica, California, designed by Charles and Ray Eames.
- Mutual of New York Building, Times Square, New York City, USA, designed by Shreve, Lamb and Harmon (who also designed the Empire State Building).
- Neutra Office Building completed in Los Angeles, California, designed by modernist architect Richard Neutra and used as his office until his death in 1970.
- Pointe des Corbeaux Lighthouse, Île d'Yeu, France, replacing the original building destroyed in 1944.
- St. George's Anglican Church, Berlin: the new building is established in the Neu-Westend neighbourhood in the British Sector as the garrison church of the British forces.
- Romney Avenue Infant School in Lockleaze, Bristol, England, designed by Richard Sheppard to utilize aluminium components made by the Bristol Aeroplane Company.
- First stages of United Nations Headquarters completed by Wallace Harrison (director of planning) in Manhattan. The Secretariat Building (by Le Corbusier and Niemeyer) is completed two years later.

== Awards ==
- AIA Gold Medal – Patrick Abercrombie.
- RIBA Royal Gold Medal – Eliel Saarinen.
- Grand Prix de Rome, architecture – Jacques Perrin-Fayolle.

== Births ==
- March 29 – Richard Feilden, English architect (died 2005)
- Herzog & de Meuron, Swiss architects:
  - April 19 – Jacques Herzog
  - May 8 – Pierre de Meuron
- October 31 – Zaha Hadid, Iraqi-born British architect (died 2016)
- Hafeez Contractor, Indian architect

== Deaths ==
- July 1 – Eliel Saarinen, Finnish architect (born 1873)
- July 8 – William Weir, British conservation architect (born 1865)
- August 31 – Maciej Nowicki, Polish architect (born 1910) (in TWA Flight 903 disaster)
