= Winged Victory (play) =

1943 play by Moss Hart

- First edition 1943
- Original language: English
- Written by: Moss Hart

Premiere
- Date: November 20, 1943
- Place: 44th Street Theatre, New York City

Winged Victory is a 1943 play by Moss Hart, created and produced by the U.S. Army Air Forces during World War II as a morale booster and as a fundraiser for the Army Emergency Relief Fund. Hart adapted the play for a 1944 motion picture directed by George Cukor.

== Plot summary ==
Winged Victory tells the story of a group of recruits struggling to make it through pilot training. The trainees are a cross-section of American young men. Their personal lives, their families and sweethearts make up a small part of the story, but most of the drama focuses on training and camaraderie. Music plays a large part in the play, and most of the huge cast were primarily members of a chorus under the direction of famed choral leader Leonard de Paur. Among the musical numbers are "My Little Dream Book of Memories," and the stirring title anthem, "Winged Victory".

== Background ==
Upon recommendation of Lt. Col. Dudley S. Dean, who had been approached with the idea by talent agent Irving Lazar and Lt. Benjamin Landis, Air Forces Commanding General Henry H. Arnold commissioned famed playwright Hart to create a stage drama that would depict both the training and work of airmen and also the commitment and devotion to duty with which they carried out this work. Arnold gave Hart complete access to Air Forces resources.

Hart traveled the United States visiting Air Forces bases and seeing firsthand how training was carried out. He then wrote an extremely patriotic and uplifting stage play based on his research. Hart partnered with Irving Lazar to produce the play and to gather actors for the huge (nearly 300) cast. Casting calls went out not only to well-known names but to Army units around the country for Air Forces personnel with theatrical or performing background. All male personnel involved with the show were service members of the U.S. Army Air Forces and were billed with their actual ranks. Among the then-notable or eventually-to-become-notable members of the cast and crew were Keith Andes, Alan Baxter, Don Beddoe, Whit Bissell, The Blackburn Twins, Sascha Brastoff, Red Buttons, Lee J. Cobb, Mario Lanza, Mark Daniels, Leonard De Paur, Brad Dexter, John Forsythe, Peter Lind Hayes, Harry Horner, Richard Travis, Karl Malden, Billy and Bobby Mauch, Kevin McCarthy, Gary Merrill, Ray Middleton, Barry Nelson, Edmond O'Brien, Walter Reed, George Reeves, Martin Ritt, Archie Robbins, David Rose, Henry Rowland, Alfred Ryder, Howard Shoup, Henry and Jack Slate, Claude Stroud, Don Taylor, and Victor Sen Yung. Most of the relatively few roles for women in the play were portrayed by wives of the actors.

== Production ==
The play opened in Boston, Massachusetts in the fall of 1943, in a pre-Broadway run, and was a huge success. It then opened in New York at the 44th Street Theatre on 20 November 1943 and became a smash hit, playing to over 350,000 people in 226 performances. During the New York run, performers in the show also toured local military camps, providing entertainment to the troops. A number of Winged Victory actors also rehearsed and produced a production of the play Yellow Jack by Sidney Howard, under the direction of Martin Ritt, which played briefly and simultaneously on Broadway. The successful run of Winged Victory on Broadway ended only in order that the entire cast travel to Hollywood to appear in the film version.

== Adaptation ==
Twentieth Century Fox purchased the rights and contracted the full cast and in the summer of 1944 produced a film version (which featured a few actors who had not been in the play, including Lon McCallister and Judy Holliday), under the direction of George Cukor.

== Tour ==
Following filming, the company embarked on a national tour of the play, performing 445 times for over 800,000 people in Los Angeles, San Francisco, Denver, Kansas City, Chicago, Detroit, Baltimore (where the theatre proved too small to admit the huge section of a bomber, part of the set for one scene), Washington D.C., and Richmond. At tour's end in April, 1945, the cast and crew were dispersed throughout the Army Air Forces, many of them transferring to the First Motion Picture Unit in California, there to make training films. The Winged Victory company (officially known as the 31st AAF Base Unit) officially disbanded in November 1945.

Due both to its enormous cast and staging demands as well as to the extremely era-specific nature of the play, Winged Victory is one of the biggest hits in Broadway history never to have a second production anywhere.
