= Dolores del Río House =

House in Los Angeles, California

Coordinates: 34.038845°N 118.508783°W

The Dolores Del Rio House at 757 Kingman Avenue is a house in Pacific Palisades, Los Angeles, that was designed for the Mexican actress Dolores del Río and her husband, the production designer Cedric Gibbons, by Douglas Honnold and George Vernon Russell in 1929.

The side of the house facing the street was likened by An Architectural Guidebook to Los Angeles to Art Deco with the rear of the house evoking the International Style. Gibbons designed the interiors of the house, replicating the Art Deco sets that he had created for MGM as a production designer. The house has four bedrooms and bathrooms over two stories with two fireplaces and a large living room with exposed beams within 3,300 square feet (310 m^{2}) of living space. Unusually, the main living room is situated on the second floor. The house has been featured in Architectural Digest in April 1992 and March 2008. The 2008 article described the house as a "streamlined love nest". Michael Smith, who restored the house for Joe Roth, who owned the house in the 2000s, said that the residence combines "iconic style with highly advanced machine-for-living technical details".

The gardens of the house were restored between 1989 and 1993 by Campbell and Campbell. The house overlooks Santa Monica Canyon. A restoration of the house by the interior designer Madeline Stuart was completed in 2016. The house was sold in 2006 for $2.9 million.
