= Arthur Gallion =

American architect

Arthur Banta Gallion
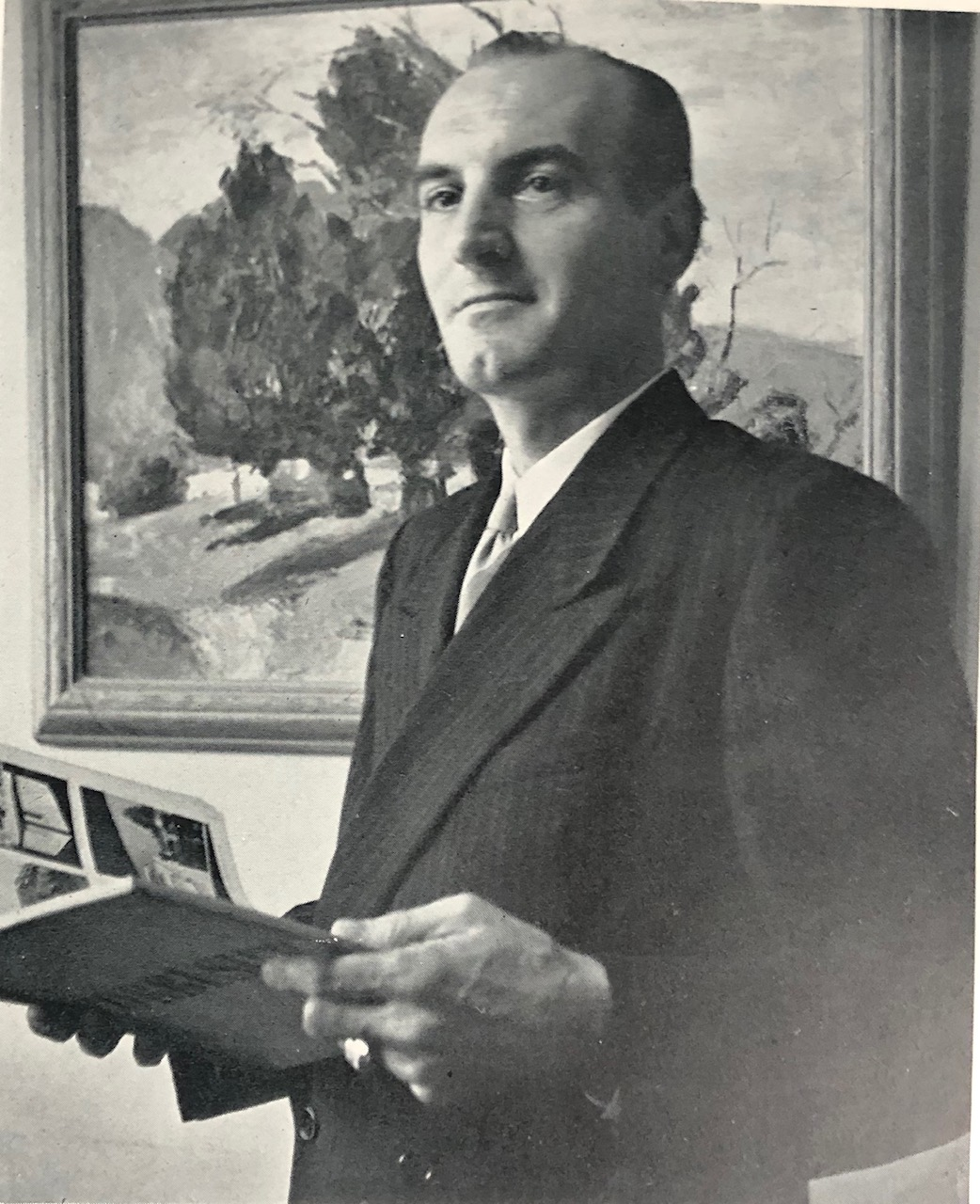
- Gallion from 1946 USC yearbook
- Born: June 30, 1902; Chicago, Illinois, U.S.
- Died: July 18, 1978 (aged 76)
- Education: University of Illinois at Urbana–Champaign; École des Beaux-Arts
- Occupation: Architect

Arthur Gallion (June 30, 1902 – July 18, 1978) was an American architect. He was the dean of architecture at the University of Southern California from 1945 to 1964. His co-authored The Urban Pattern: City Planning and Design "became the standard textbook in the field".

== Early life ==
Arthur Gallion was born on June 30, 1902, in Chicago, Illinois. He graduated with a Bachelor of Science degree in architecture from the University of Illinois at Urbana–Champaign in 1924. He won a Steedman Fellowship to travel in Europe in 1927–1928, during which time he attended the École des Beaux-Arts in Paris, France.

== Career ==
Gallion began his career as an architect in Urbana, Illinois. He worked for the Public Works Administration in Washington, D.C., from 1934 to 1936. He then moved his practice to Oakland, California, where he designed houses until 1945. During World War II, he also designed projects for the federal government.

Gallion served as the dean of architecture at the University of Southern California from 1945 to 1964. During his tenure, he founded the department of industrial design, chaired by Raymond Loewy. He served on the Los Angeles City Regional Planning Unit shortly after World War II. In 1951, he co-authored a book on urban design with Simon Eisner; it "became the standard textbook in the field". He became a fellow of the American Institute of Architects in 1957.

Gallion designed the Raymond Joseph Sedlachek in Sherman Oaks. With fellow architects Frederick Earl Emmons, Douglas Honnold, A. Quincy Jones, Maynard Lyndon, John Leon Rex and Raphael Soriano, he designed the San Pedro Community Hospital at 1300 West 7th Street in San Pedro, Los Angeles in 1958–1960.

== Death ==
Gallion died on July 18, 1978.

== Works ==
- Eisner, Simon; Gallion, Arthur (1951). The Urban Pattern: City Planning and Design. New York: Van Nostrand. OCLC 213798727.
