= Maynard Lyndon =

American architect

- Born: September 6, 1907; Howell, Michigan, U.S.
- Died: November 15, 1999 (aged 92); Germany
- Education: University of Michigan
- Occupation: Architect
- Spouse: Joyce Earley Lyndon
- Children: 2 sons (including Donlyn Lyndon), 1 daughter

Maynard Lyndon FAIA (September 6, 1907 – November 15, 1999) was an American architect. He designed over 40 school buildings in Michigan and California, including the Northville School, known as "the first modern public school in North America". He also designed Bunche Hall on the UCLA campus.

== Early life ==
Lyndon was born on September 6, 1907, in Howell, Michigan. He graduated from the University of Michigan in 1928.

== Career ==
Lyndon began his career as a draughtsman for architect Albert Kahn in Detroit, Michigan, from 1928 to 1930. Over the course of his career, he designed over 40 school buildings in Michigan and California. He designed were meant to bring in natural light into classrooms.

By 1936-1937, he designed the Northville School in Northville, Michigan. According to The Los Angeles Times, with its "concrete construction coupled with refined brick and glass walls", it was "considered the first modern public school in North America". Lyndon was awarded a Silver Medal at the 5th Pan American Congress of Architects in Montevideo, Uruguay, in 1940 for it. The building was demolished in 2019.

By 1942–1943, with Oscar Stonorov, Lyndon worked on the Wilow Run Housing, a housing estate for workers of the Ford Motor Company designed by Kahn. He designed the Apperson Street School at 10233 Woodward Avenue in Sunland, California, in 1946-1947. He then designed the South Hill Street Ticket Office building for the Atchison, Topeka and Santa Fe Railway at 601 South Hill Street in Downtown Los Angeles from 1947 to 1948.

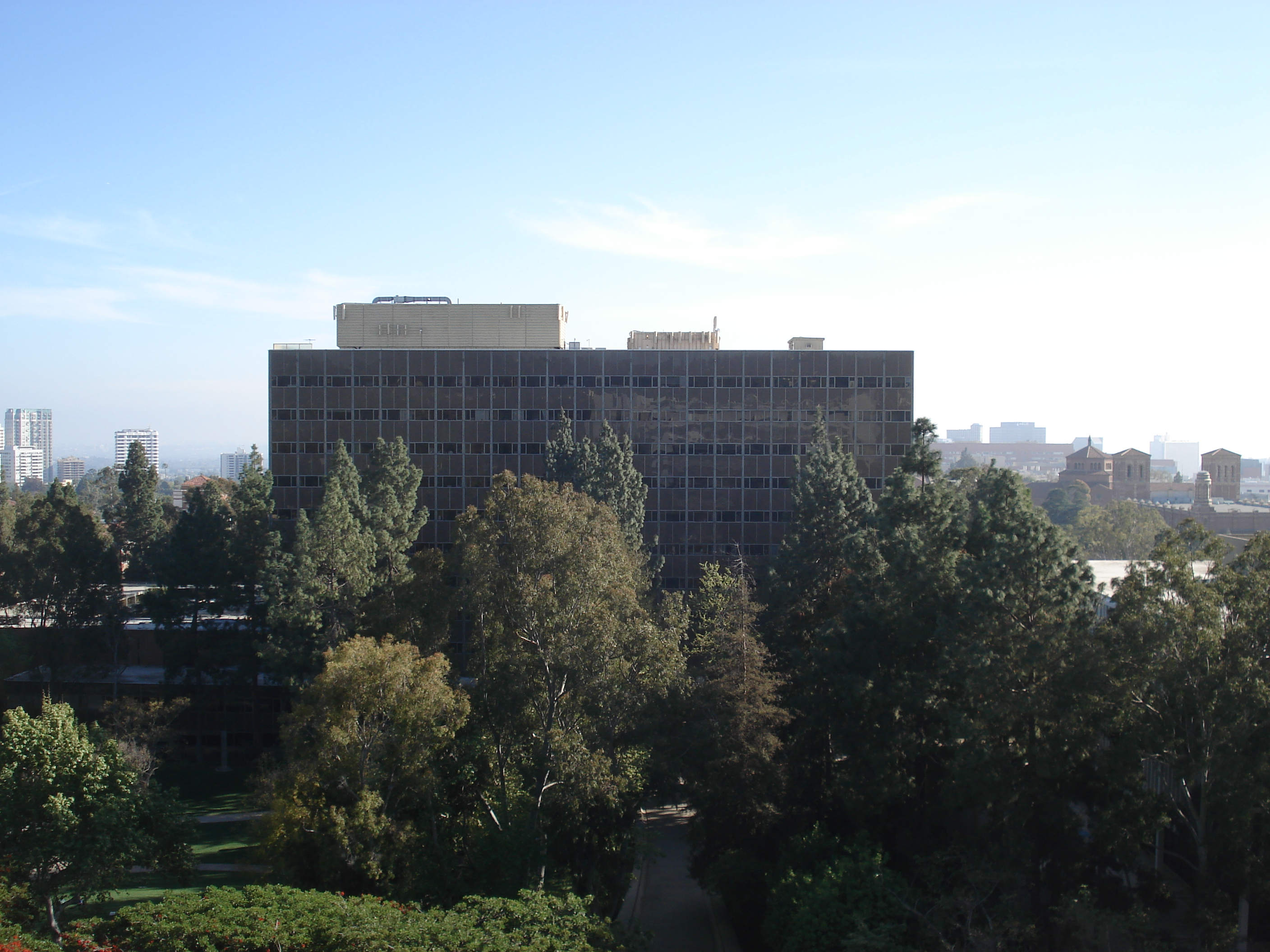
Bunche Hall on the UCLA campus from a distance, 2008.

Lyndon designed the Vista Elementary School in Vista, California, in 1950. He also designed the Meiners Oaks School in Ojai, California, and the Webster School in Malibu. Additionally, he designed the Culver City Hospital in Culver City in 1952. By 1955, he designed the 28th Church of Christ, Scientist at 1018 Hilgard Avenue in Westwood, Los Angeles, just off the UCLA campus (since demolished). A decade later, in 1964, he designed Bunche Hall on the campus of the University of California, Los Angeles (UCLA). He also designed the Harvey Knox shop in Beverly Hills, California.

With fellow architects Frederick Earl Emmons, Arthur Gallion, Douglas Honnold, A. Quincy Jones, John Leon Rex and Raphael Soriano, he designed the San Pedro Community Hospital at 1300 West 7th Street in San Pedro, Los Angeles in 1958-1960.

Lyndon became a Fellow of the American Institute of Architects in 1952.

== Personal life and death ==
Lyndon was married to landscape designer Joyce Earley Lyndon. They had two sons, including architect Donlyn Lyndon, and a daughter. They resided in a house he designed in 1949 located at 28820 Cliffside Drive in Malibu, California. By the 1970s, they moved to Kussaberg, Germany.

Lyndon died on November 15, 1999, in Germany.
