= Frederick Earl Emmons =

American architect (1907–1999)

- Born: December 19, 1907; Orleans, New York, U.S.
- Died: August 23, 1999 (aged 91); Belvedere, California, U.S.
- Education: Cornell University
- Occupation: Architect

Frederick Earl Emmons (December 19, 1907 - August 23, 1999) was an American architect whose work includes mid-century modern buildings. With A. Quincy Jones, he designed many residential properties, including tract houses developed by Joseph Eichler in the Pacific Palisades, Orange, Palo Alto, San Rafael, and commercial buildings in Palm Springs, Pomona, Whittier and Los Angeles. They also designed the Charles E. Young Research Library on the campus of the University of California, Los Angeles (UCLA).

== Early life ==
Frederick Earl Emmons was born on December 19, 1907, in Orleans, New York. He graduated from Cornell University in 1929.

== Career ==
Emmons began his career by working as a draughtsman for McKim, Mead & White in 1930-1932. He worked for architect William Wurster from 1938 to 1939, and for Allied Engineers from 1940 to 1942. He served in the United States Navy Reserve from 1942 to 1946. By 1946, he started his own architectural practice in Los Angeles.

Emmons opened an architectural practice with A. Quincy Jones in 1950. The first year, they designed the Sascha Brastoff Ceramics Factory located at 11520 West Olympic Boulevard in Downtown Los Angeles, the Brody House in the Pacific Palisades, the Romanoff's on the Rocks Restaurant on Highway 111 in Palm Springs, and the King Cole Market and Shopping Center in Whittier. By 1952, they designed the Southdown Estates Houses at 16310 Akron Street in the Pacific Palisades. They also designed the Nicholas P. Daphne Funeral Home located at 1 Church street in San Francisco, California, in 1952-1953; it was demolished in 2000. They designed the Hugheston Meadows Housing Tract, which won an Award of Merit from the National Association of Home Builders in 1953. In 1954, they designed the Huberland House at 16060 Royal Oaks Road in Encino in 1954, and the Building Contractors' Association Building in Pomona. In 1965 they completed Country Club Estates, a 30-unit development in Palm Springs, California.

Emmons and Jones designed their own office, Jones & Emmons Architectural Office Building, in Los Angeles in 1955, as well as the West Wilshire Swimming Pool in Los Angeles, and the St. Matthew's Episcopal Church in the Pacific Palisades, which was destroyed by arson in 1978. In 1963, they designed the Shorecliff Tower Apartments at 535 Ocean Avenue in Santa Monica. In 1964, they designed the Charles E. Young Research Library on the campus of the University of California, Los Angeles (UCLA). A year later, they designed a house at 901 Airole Way, in Bel Air.

Emmons and Jones also designed several houses in Orange, California, for developer Joseph Eichler. In particular they designed a house at 602 East Briardale Avenue House and another house at 1843 North Woodside Street House, both of which were located in the Fairmeadows Tract. They also designed two housing tracts for Eichler in Palo Alto: the Fairmeadow Housing Tract in 1953 and the Greenmeadow Housing Tract in 1954-1955. In 1956, they designed the X-100 House in another development by Eichler in San Mateo. They designed houses on another Eichler housing tract known as the Terra Linda Housing Tract, in San Rafael, in 1954-1955, while some houses on the same track were designed by Anshen & Allen. They also designed the Pardee-Phillips Housing Tract for Eichler in the Pacific Palisades. Additionally, they designed six houses for the Estates Oceanside Housing Development in San Luis Rey.

With fellow architects Douglas Honnold, Arthur Gallion, A. Quincy Jones, Maynard Lyndon, John Leon Rex and Raphael Soriano, Emmons designed the San Pedro Community Hospital at 1300 West 7th Street in San Pedro, Los Angeles in 1958-1960.

Emmons was a member of the Southern California chapter of the American Institute of Architects. He retired in 1972.

== Personal life and death ==
Emmons had lived in Belvedere, California since 1973. His wife, Cynthia, died in 1991. Emmons died eight years later, on August 23, 1999 in Belvedere, aged 91.
