= Sascha Brastoff =

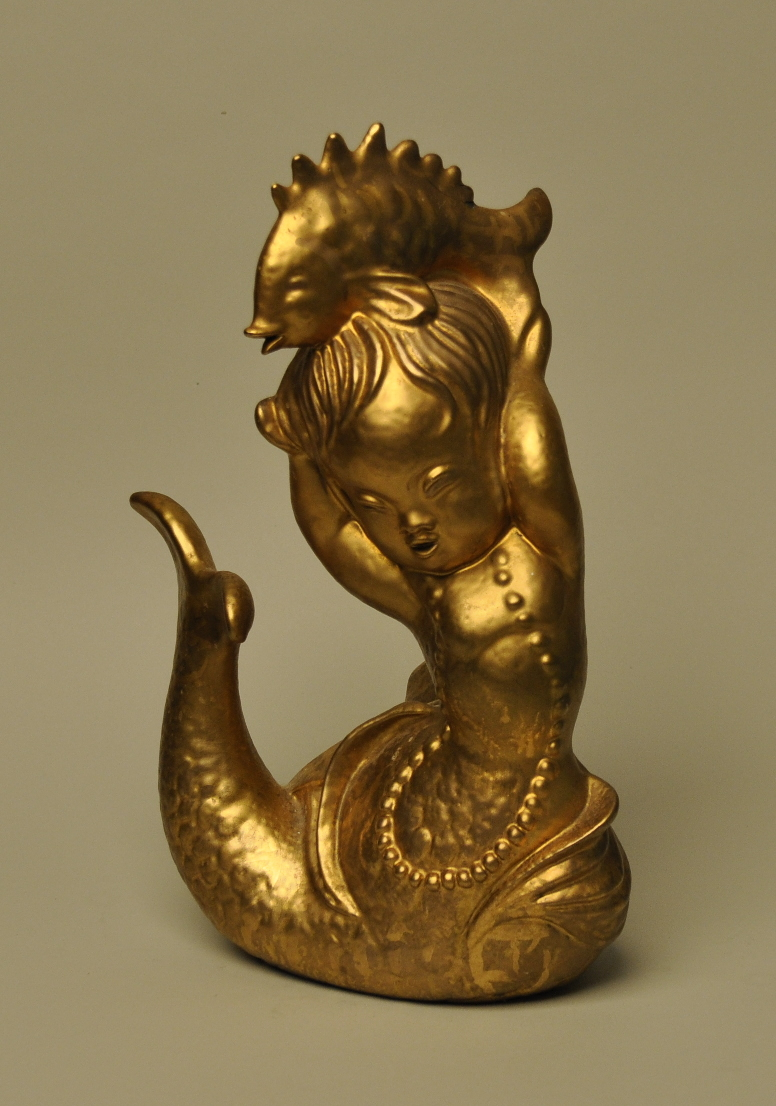
A mermaid sculpted by Sascha Brastoff.

Sascha Brastoff (October 23, 1918 – February 4, 1993) was an American designer who had a ceramics studio.

He was active in the Los Angeles area from 1947 to 1963, after which he left his company due to ill health.

The Sascha Brastoff Ceramics Factory, designed by architects A. Quincy Jones and Frederick Earl Emmons, was located at 11520 West Olympic Boulevard in West Los Angeles.

Brastoff was the long-term romantic partner of Hollywood costume designer Howard Shoup.
