= St. Matthew's Episcopal Church and School (Pacific Palisades, California) =

Episcopal church and school in Pacific Palisades, California

Parish of St. Matthew, Pacific Palisades
- Location: 1031 Bienveneda Ave; Pacific Palisades, Los Angeles, California, U.S.
- Denomination: Episcopal
- Website: stmatthews.com stmatthewschool.com

Architecture
- Architect(s): Frederick Earl Emmons (first church); Moore Ruble Yudell (second church)
- Completed: 1983

Administration
- Diocese: Episcopal Diocese of Los Angeles

Clergy
- Rector: Rev. Bruce A. Freeman, Rev. KC Robertson, Rev. Stephen Smith

The Parish of Saint Matthew is an Episcopal church and lower school in Pacific Palisades, Los Angeles. The original church was destroyed during the 1978 Agoura-Malibu firestorm. It was rebuilt in 1983. On January 8, 2025, the church was damaged and several school buildings were destroyed in the Palisades Fire.

== History ==
St. Matthew's Parish was founded in 1941. The first church was built by the architect Frederick Earl Emmons. On May 2, 1949, an Episcopal preschool on Swarthmore Avenue was opened for twenty-four children. The parish moved to a 28-acre lot on Bienveneda Avenue at the Garland Ranch in 1953 and an elementary school was added with over two-hundred students. The original church building was destroyed by the 1978 Agoura-Malibu firestorm. The congregation hired the architectural firm Moore Ruble Yudell to build a new church building, which was completed in 1983.

The congregation is part of the Episcopal Diocese of Los Angeles.

The funerals for actors Charlton Heston and Edward Andrews were held at St. Matthew's.

On January 8, 2025 the church was damaged and the school was destroyed by the Palisades Fire. The church and school were evacuated the day before the fire reached the parish.

On October 19, 2025 the parish would reopen for Sunday services.

== Notable school alumni ==
- Jason Segel (born 1980), actor and writer
