= The Barn (Los Angeles) =

General information
- Type: House
- Architectural style: Mid-century modern
- Location: 10300 Santa Monica Boulevard, Century City, Los Angeles, California
- Construction started: 1965
- Owner: Annenberg Foundation

Technical details
- Floor area: 3,729 sq ft (346.4 m^{2})

Design and construction
- Architect: A. Quincy Jones
- Jones, A. Quincy, Barn
- U.S. National Register of Historic Places
- Location within the Los Angeles metropolitan area Location within California Location within the United States
- Location: 10300 W. Santa Monica Boulevard, Los Angeles, California
- Coordinates: 34°03′31″N 118°25′19″W
- Area: less than one acre
- NRHP reference No.: 100009646
- Added to NRHP: December 26, 2023

The Barn is a house built by architect A. Quincy Jones in 1950 as his personal home and office. In 2009 Jones' wife sold the house for US$2,000,000 to the Annenberg Foundation, which uses the building as office space and for private events. The building was listed on the National Register of Historic Places in 2023.

== Renovation ==
The Annenberg Foundation hired Frederick Fisher to renovate the building after they acquired it in November 2009. Fisher kept the building nearly original, only updating the ventilation and light fixtures.
