= 2 Holden Street =

House in Adelaide, Australia

Coordinates: 34°55′15″S 138°39′17″E

2 Holden Street is a house in the Kensington Park district of Adelaide, Australia. It was the residence of the cricketer Don Bradman, his wife Jessie, and their family. The house was commissioned by the couple and built in 1934; they lived in the house until their respective deaths in 1997 and 2001.

== History ==
The Bradmans moved to Adelaide from Sydney in 1934. Bradman had moved to Adelaide as he had been promised a job as a stockbroker with the support of Harry Hodgetts, an Adelaide businessman and Australian Cricket Board of Control committee member. The house was commissioned by the Bradmans and designed by Philip Claridge, a local architect. Bradman had met the architect as a result of his work maintaining the Adelaide Oval. The house is situated on Holden Road in the Kensington Park district of eastern Adelaide. It is 2 storeys in height and built in the neo-Georgian style in red brick. Claridge subsequently added an extension to the house for a billiard room. Bradman numbered the letterbox of the house '2a' to deter fans. Bradman played for the local Kensington Cricket Club at the Kensington Oval, a short walk from his house. Bradman's fame ensured that the house attracted fans and tourists including a group of 100 schoolchildren from Melbourne and Sydney in 1938 and the comedian Arthur Askey in 1949. Bradman met businessman Kerry Packer at the house in February 1979 to reconcile divisions over Packer's World Series Cricket.

Bradman lived at the property for 65 years, and died at the house on 25 February 2001. Jessie had predeceased him in September 1997. There is no commemoration of Bradman at the house or indication that he lived there. Robin Sellick's 1993 portrait of the Bradmans in front of the fireplace of the house is in the collection of the National Portrait Gallery in Sydney.

== Contemporary reception ==
Visiting the house for The Times of India in 2024, Partha Bhaduri felt that it was "in its lonesome, defiant splendour, a living, breathing artifact of cricket history". Barry Gibbs, manager of the Bradman Collection at the State Library of South Australia said in 2004 that Indian people were "mad about anything to do with Bradman. Some of them almost regard him as a deity. But [Bradman] could never understand what all the fuss was about." ESPNcricinfo writer Aaron Owen considered the property "simple and humble" considering Bradman's fame and renown. A 2004 Sydney Morning Herald article considered the house "unremarkable to the eye".

== Heritage register listing ==
In 1987 the house was nominated for the South Australian Heritage Register but was dropped after Bradman opposed it. In 1998 Bradman wrote in a letter, "At 89 years of age, I am not prepared to exist just to satisfy the autograph hunters' requests. People just seem to want my signature before I die." In 2004 it was placed onto a local heritage register by the City of Burnside. The council's chief executive officer, John Hanlon, said that "it really comes back to what the criteria is for local heritage significance and that centres around the fact that it has either a social importance, it has a place of importance or it's important because of a notable local personality – I guess The Don certainly fits that description" and that no objections had been received from Bradman's family. Bradman's granddaughter, Greta Bradman, said that "I can understand grandpa not wanting to have the house on the list, not wanting people coming around while he was living there ... I think it was a mark of respect to grandpa - to both of my grandparents - to keep the house off the list while they were alive" and that his family felt that the listing of the house was inevitable.
