= Great Synagogue of Lyon =

Historic Orthodox synagogue in Lyon, France

- French: Grande synagogue de Lyon
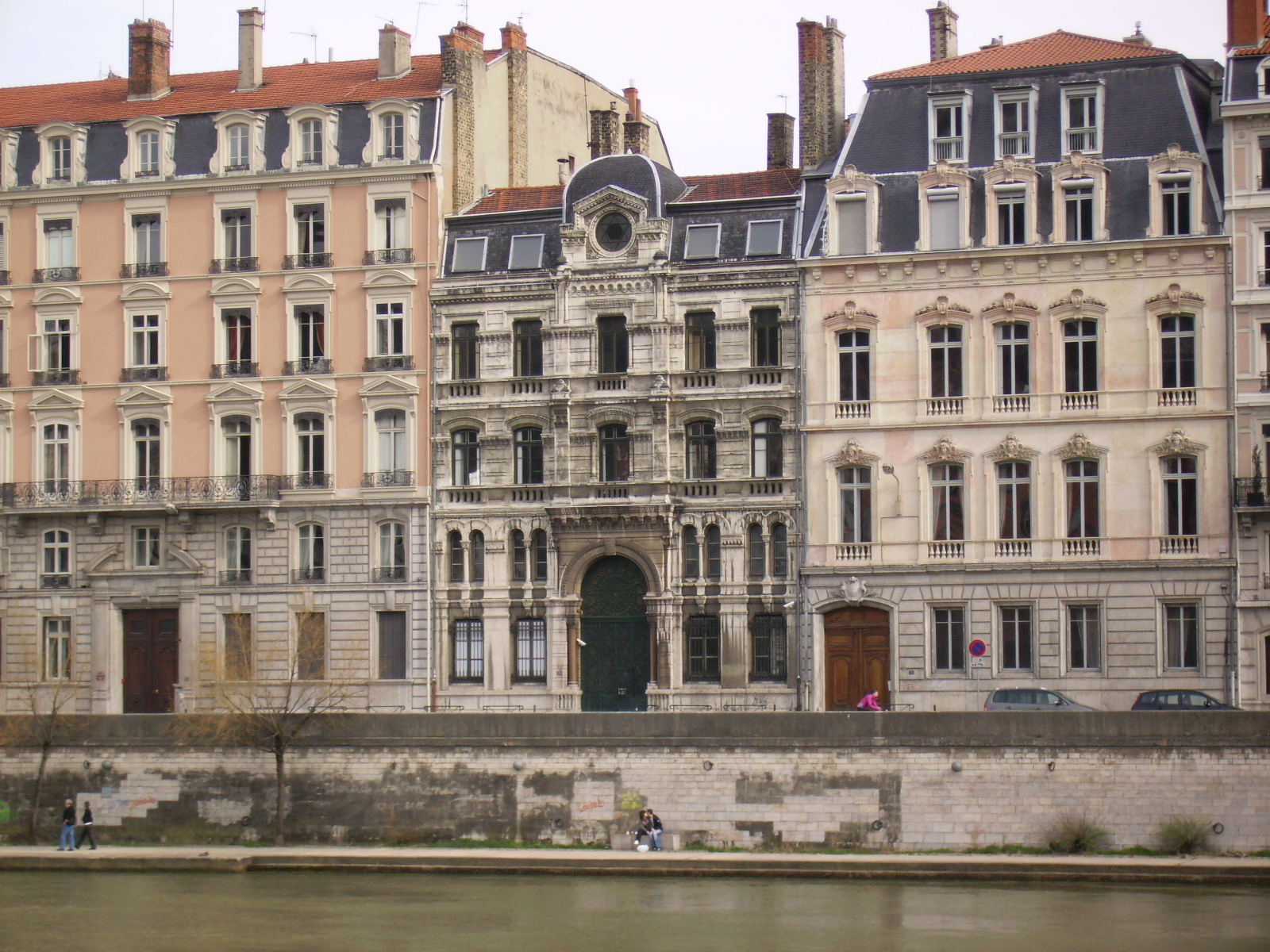
- View of the synagogue from the Quai Fulchiron

Religion
- Affiliation: Orthodox Judaism
- Rite: Nusach Ashkenaz
- Ecclesiastical or organizational status: Synagogue
- Status: Active

Location
- Location: 13 quai Tilsitt, IIe arrondissement, Lyon
- Country: France
- Interactive map of Great Synagogue of Lyon
- Coordinates: 45°45′26″N 4°49′40″E

Architecture
- Architect: Abraham Hirsch
- Type: Synagogue architecture
- Style: Byzantine Revival
- Established: 1849 (as a congregation)
- Completed: 1864
- Construction cost: 1,175,000 francs

Specifications
- Capacity: 550 worshippers
- Materials: Stone

Monument historique
- Official name: Synagogue
- Type: Base Mérimée
- Designated: 5 December 1984
- Reference no.: PA00117987

The Great Synagogue of Lyon (French: Grande synagogue de Lyon) is an Orthodox Jewish congregation and synagogue located at 13 quai Tilsitt in the IIe arrondissement of Lyon, France. Designed by Abraham Hirsch in the Byzantine Revival style, the synagogue was built between 1863 and 1864 and renovated in 2014. The building was listed as a monument historique on 5 December 1984. The congregation worships in the Ashkenazi rite.

== History ==
=== Building ===
In the early 19th century, there were only a few Jews in Lyon, and the community was originally attached to the Consistory of Marseille. As the Jewish population increased, a communal rabbinate was formed on 11 November 1849. The first place of worship, located in a rented hall in the rue Écorche-Bœuf (now called rue Port-du-Temple) was replaced at the end of its lease by a flat in the rue Bellecordière; and on 25 June 1850 a new temple was inaugurated in the rue Peyrat (now rue Alphonsus Fochier).

On 23 October 1857, Emperor Napoleon III, by decree, created a regional Consistory, which gathered communities in the departments of Rhone, Loire, Isère, Ain, Jura, Saône-et-Loire and Doubs. On 24 June 1858, the first regional Chief Rabbi took office and on 5 December of the same year the Consistory received its charter.

On 4 May 1858, a new temple opened on the Place Bellecour in a rented hall, but the community wanted to build a synagogue that could properly represent the community. On 5 December 1859, the Consistory solicited to Senator and prefect of Lyon Claude-Marius Vaïsse a land to build a synagogue. On 3 September 1860, the city of Lyon proposed to the community a plot of land in the Jardin des Plantes and the Montée des Carmélites in the 1st arrondissement of Lyon. The construction commission, specially created on 6 March 1861 to manage the construction project of the synagogue, issued a negative opinion about the location proposed by the mayor, and suggested the area of Customs located on quai Tilsitt, which was refused.

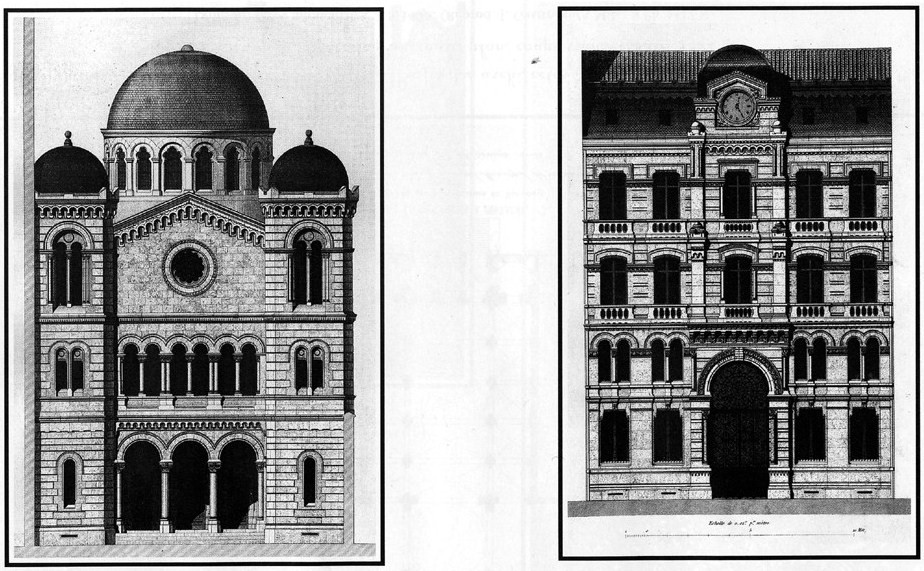
Plan of architect : the facade on the courtyard (left), the facade on the street (right). Lithograph by Lebel after Abraham Hirsch

On 6 March 1862, Joseph Kippenheim was elected president of the consistory and proposed a temporary place of worship at the Salle des Monnaies. On 28 March 1862, the city offered a plot of land in the Quai Tilsit, the old salt warehouse, which had 19 feet (5.8 m) of facade and a 759 square-meter area, in exchange for land at the Jardin des Plantes, and a 25,000-franc cash payment. The work was entrusted to the young Jewish architect Abraham Hirsch (1828–1913) who later became the official architect of the city of Lyon. The work cost about 1,175,000 francs, and on 10 April 1862, the Presbytery issued bonds for that amount.

On 20 May 1863, the laying of the cornerstone took place, and the official inauguration with civilian and military authorities, and representatives of other religions, took place on 23 June 1864.

=== World War II ===
During World War II, the city of Lyon was initially part of the zone libre and received a large number of Jewish refugees from the occupied part of France.

On 10 December 1943, twenty minutes into the evening worship, as the Lekha Dodi hymn was being recited, two hand grenades were thrown into the synagogue by people who managed to escape by car. Luckily, eight worshippers had only minor injuries. The attackers were never identified.

On 13 June 1944, the French militia entered the synagogue and arrested everyone present. The secretary of the consistory and the prime minister of the synagogue were arrested, as were the caretaker, his wife and housekeeper. All those arrested that day were first interned at Montluc Prison, then were transferred on 30 June to the Drancy internment camp, and were deported to Auschwitz on 31 July 1944. The synagogue was closed for two months during the summer of 1944, after the deportation of the rabbi and his family.

Lyon was liberated on 2 September 1944. In his testimony of 12 April 1945, Eugene Weill mentioned that when he went to the synagogue on the liberation of Lyon, "the synagogue [is] in a dreadful state, the hall of the temple served as local of drinking militia, the plaques of soldiers killed during the War, served as targets, the Torah scrolls also, there are still sockets on the ground, lamps, chairs and benches have been ransacked, prayer books scattered."

After the liberation, Rabbi David Feuerwerker became the Chief Rabbi of Lyon (1944–1946). It abolished the use of the organ in the synagogue during Shabbat and holidays. It celebrated, among others, the marriage of the parents of future and current Chief Rabbi of Lyon, Richard Wertenschlag.

=== Today ===
The consistory of Lyon, located in the outbuildings of the synagogue, is the oldest Jewish institution in Lyon and coordinates educational and cultural activities of various synagogues in the Rhone-Alpes-Centre. It is also responsible for many social actions to aid the needy and sick. In Lyon, there are currently about 40,000 Jews and 35 synagogues and shrines, which cover all shades of French Judaism.

The Grande synagogue de Lyon, like the Notre-Dame de Fourvière built at the same time (opened in 1870), enjoyed many technological advances in the late nineteenth century. The building was deteriorating rapidly and infiltration of water under the arches and in the aisles threatened to detect the stones of the building. The first part of the work cost 400,000 euros. For this, the Consistory, under the chairmanship of Marcel Dreyfus, asked the City of Lyon, as well as other territorial, regional and departmental collectivities. He also asked the generosity of donors and the product of multiple auctions.

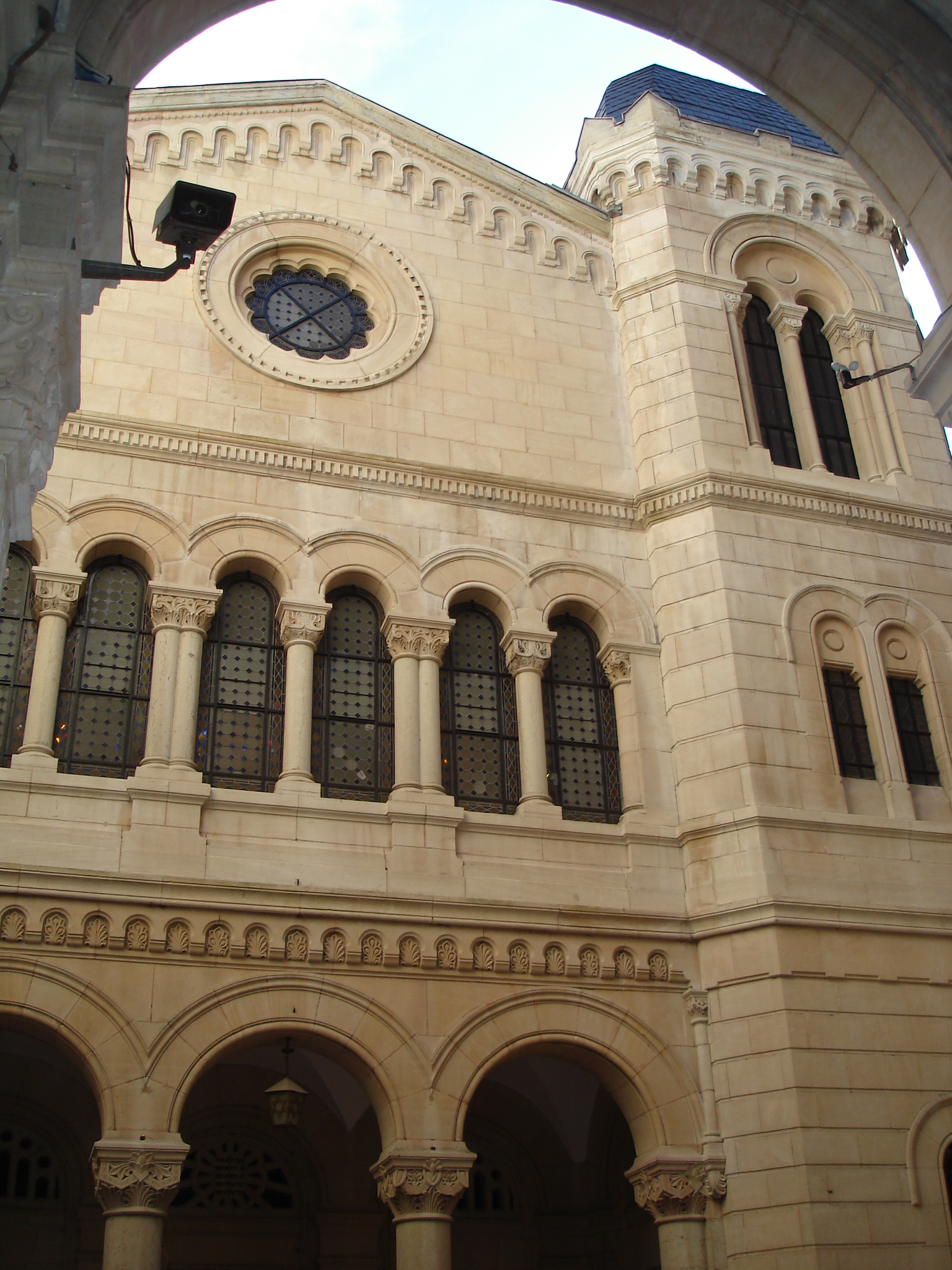
Facade of the building on the courtiyard

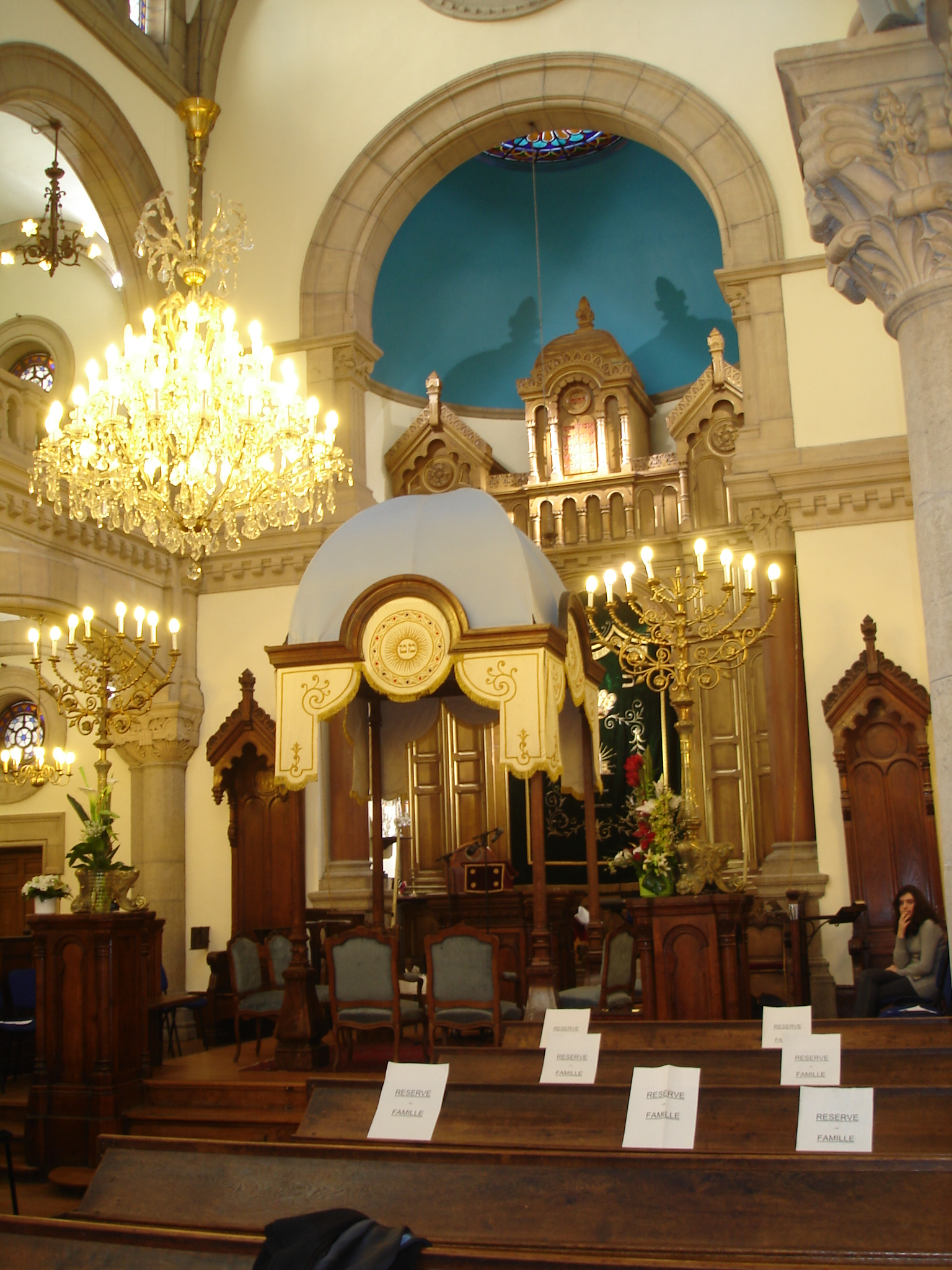
The Torah ark and the bimah

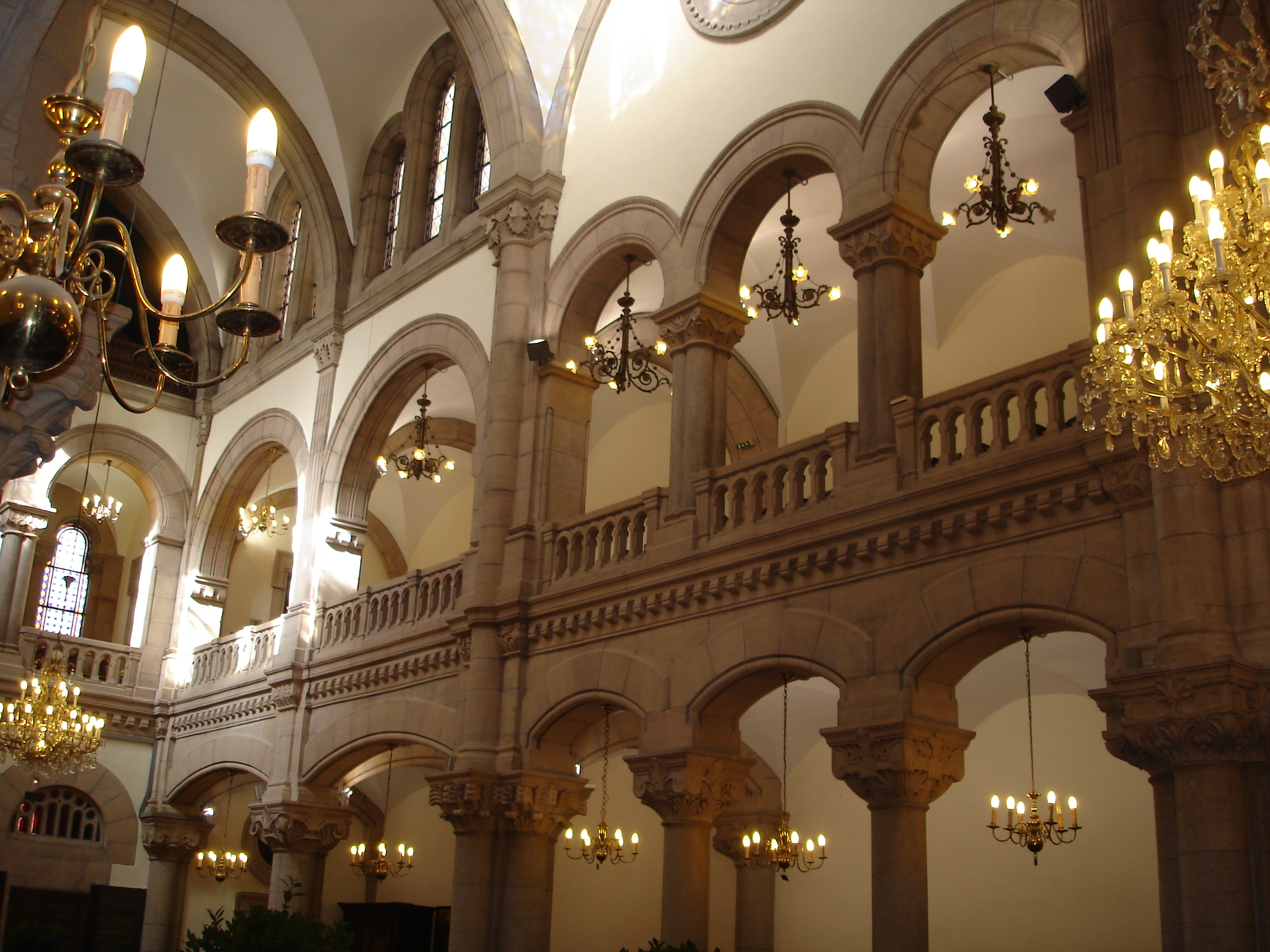
The women's gallery

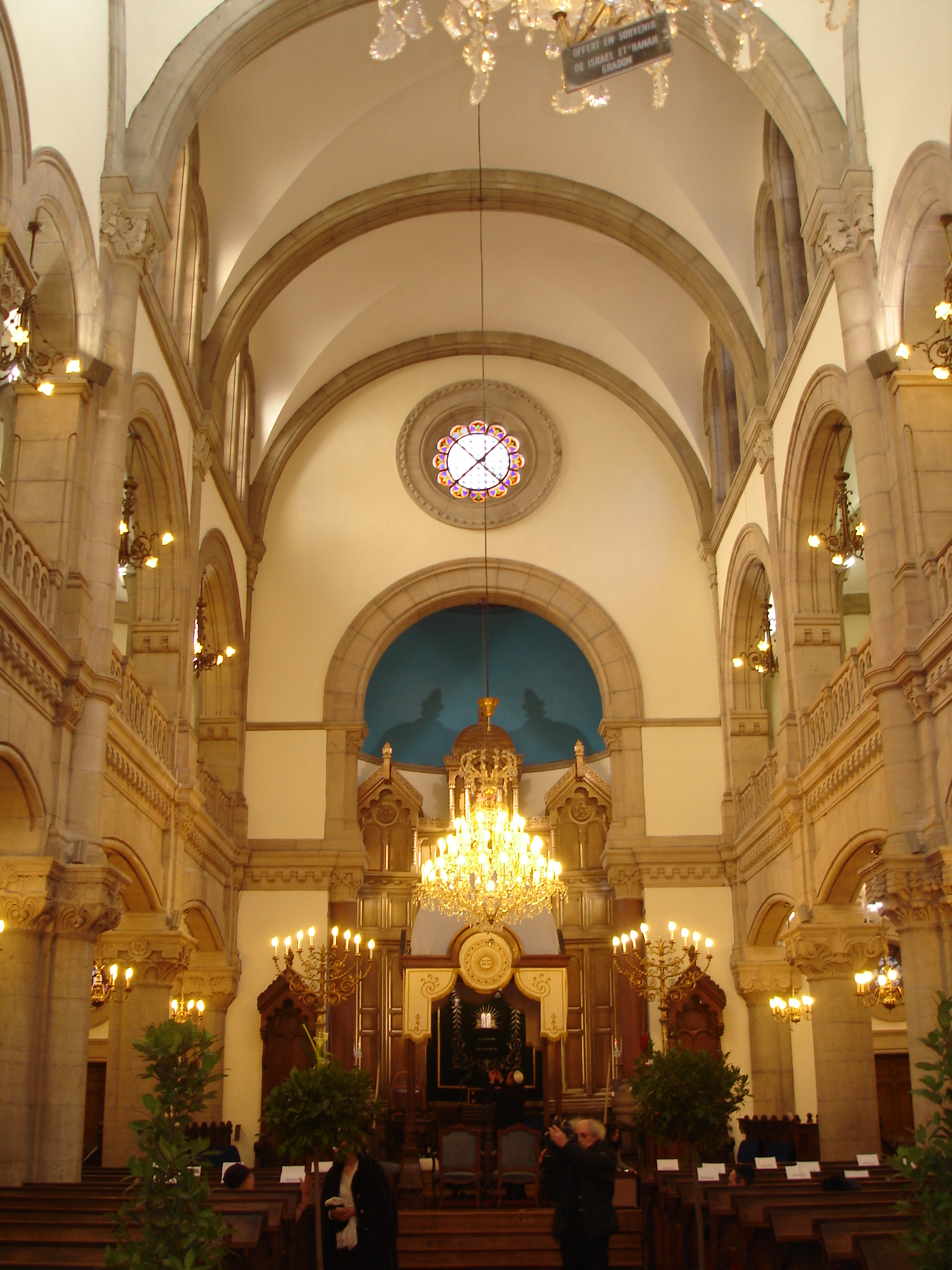
General view of the inside

At the meeting of 14 January 2008, the City Council awarded a grant of 90,197 euro, which corresponded to 50% of roofing and 50% of repairs to the facade on the rue Tilsit. This resolution was confirmed by the meeting of 23 June 2008, which approved the agreement on objectives and resources and defined the respective obligations of the City of Lyon and the Association of Jewish worship as well as the procedure for granting the subsidy.

The rabbi of the synagogue is Nissim Malka, The Hazzan (cantor), which provides a reading of the Torah, is Gilles Kahn.

== Architecture ==
The synagogue is composed of two buildings: one with a façade overlooking on the quai Tilsit and with a 160 m^{2} (1,700 sq ft) area, and the other with a 550 m^{2} (5,900 sq ft) area separated from the first building by a small 120 m^{2} (1,300 sq ft) courtyard. The access to the building is by the courtyard, through a porch located below the first building, enclosed by a wrought iron gate.

A small vestibule, open to the court by three arches, provides access to the prayer room with three wooden doors. This large rectangular room is divided into three parts: the central nave of the building height, and on each side the aisles, which are lower, separated from the nave by twelve columns recalling the twelve tribes of Israel. Each column is topped by a various Corinthian or composite styled capital. On each side, above the aisles as well as above the entrance hall, there is the gallery reserved for women with balustrades of stone columns.

Above the entrance, on the second floor, the organ in wood is damaged and requires extensive restoration. It is the former organ of the Basilica of Saint-Martin d'Ainay, sold in 1864 to the synagogue during its construction.

The synagogue has 320 wooden stalls on the ground floor reserved for men and 235 in the gallery on the first floor for women.

== Gallery ==
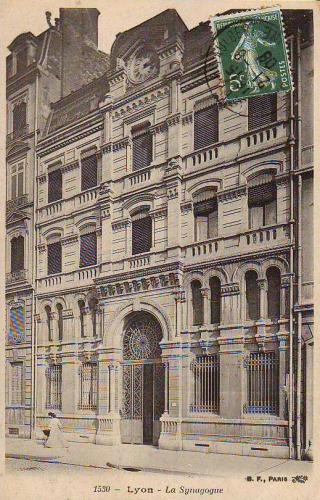
The synagogue in 1908 as it appeared on a postcard

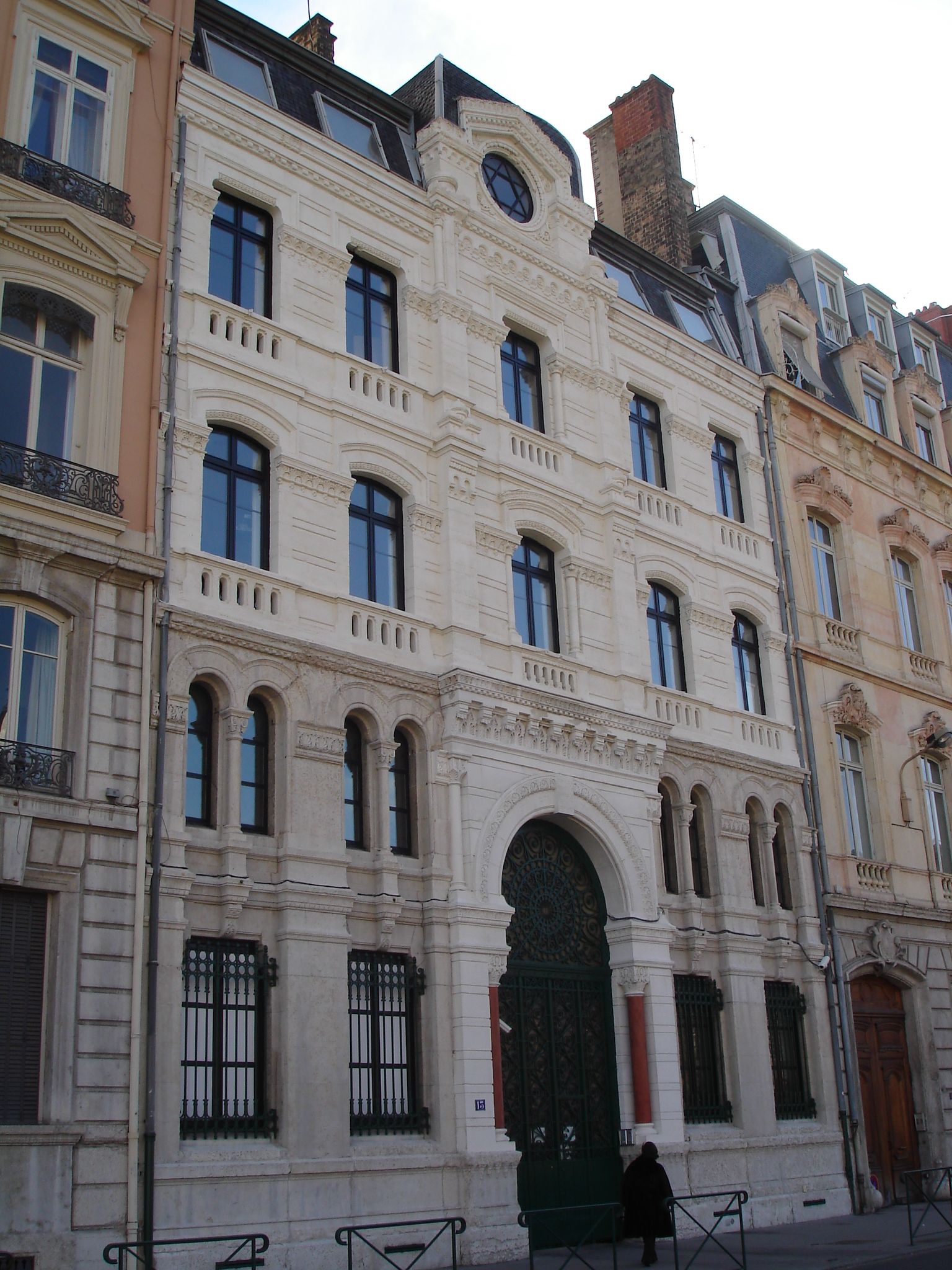
The synagogue: facade on the Quai Tilsitt

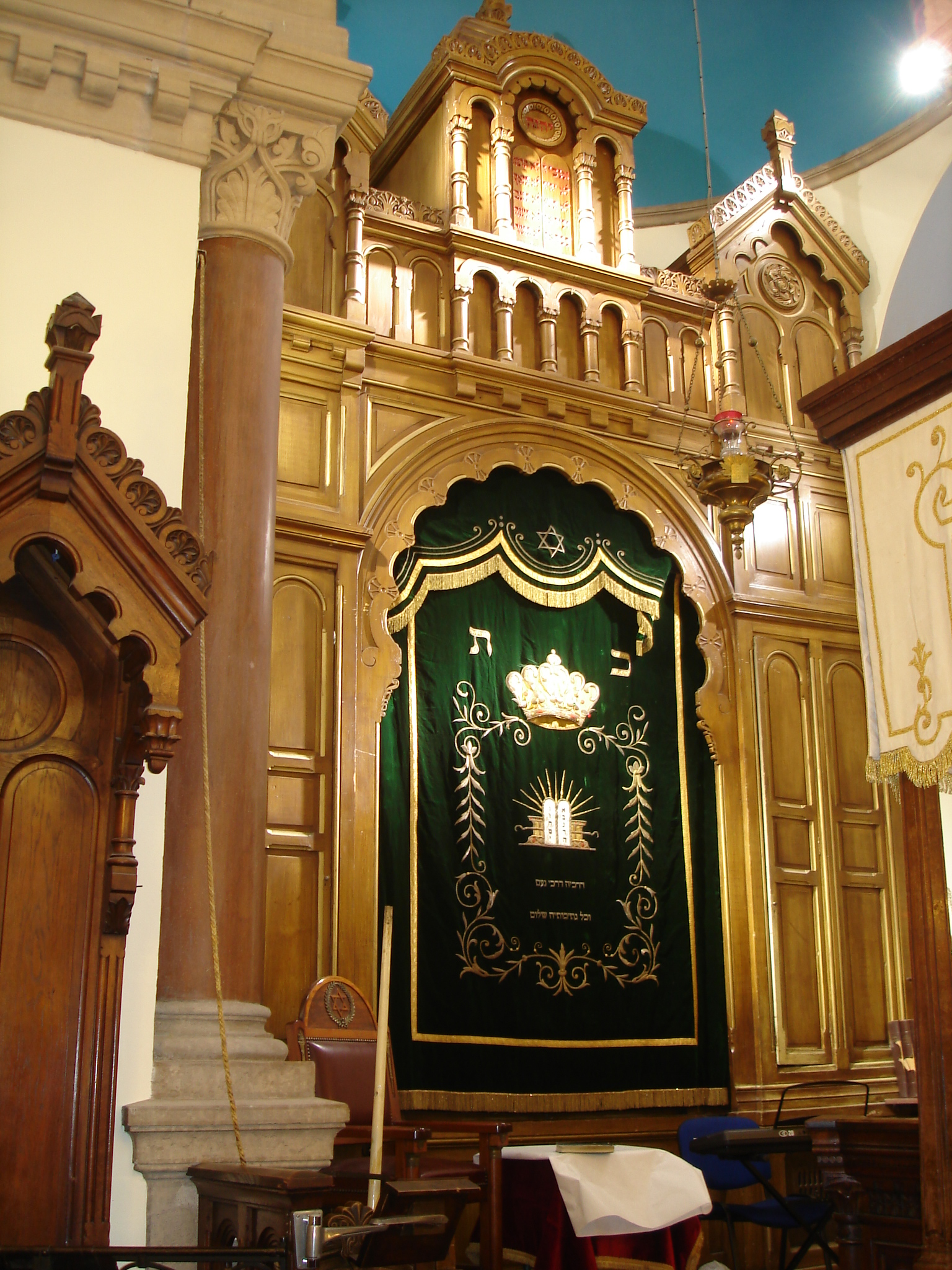
The Torah ark

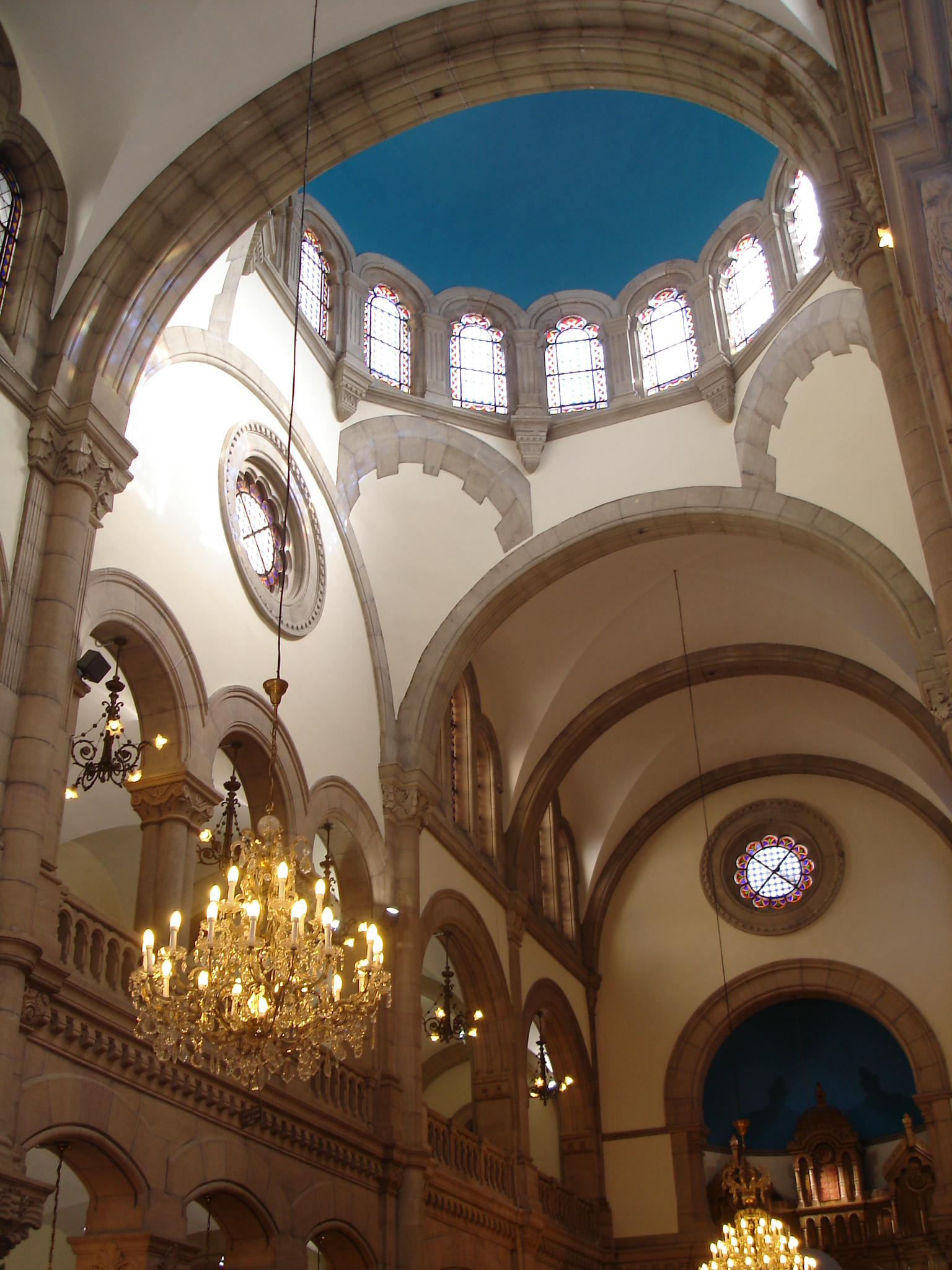
View of the dome

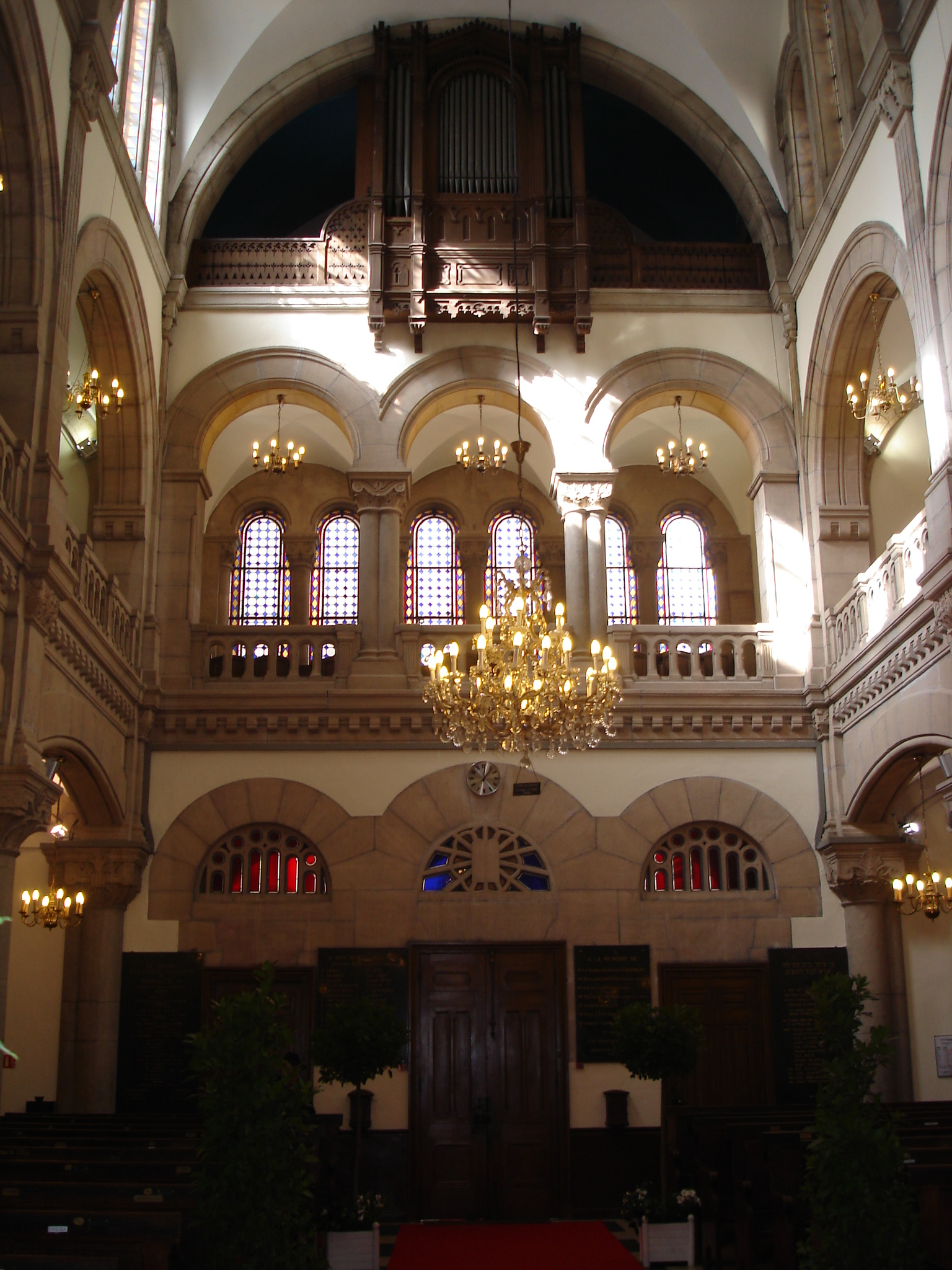
View of the entrance and of the organ

== See also ==
- History of Lyon
- History of the Jews in France
- List of synagogues in France
