= Howard Shoup =

American costume designer (1903–1987)

- Born: Conway Howard Shoup; August 29, 1903; Dallas, Texas, U.S.
- Died: May 29, 1987 (aged 83); Los Angeles, California, U.S.
- Occupation: Costume designer
- Years active: 1937–1967

Howard Shoup (August 29, 1903 – May 29, 1987) was an American costume designer. He has been nominated for the Academy Award for Best Costume Design five times.

He had over 170 film credits during his long career. Including films like Ocean's 11 and Cool Hand Luke. Shoup designed the clothing worn by Judy Garland at her April 1961 Carnegie Hall concert and on her 1962 television special.

Shoup was the long-term romantic partner of artist Sascha Brastoff.

== Oscar Nominations ==
All 5 nominations were for Best Costumes-Black and White.

- 32nd Academy Awards-Nominated for The Young Philadelphians. Lost to Some Like It Hot.
- 33rd Academy Awards-Nominated for The Rise and Fall of Legs Diamond. Lost to The Facts of Life.
- 34th Academy Awards-Nominated for Claudelle Inglish. Lost to La Dolce Vita.
- 37th Academy Awards-Nominated for Kisses for My President. Lost to The Night of the Iguana.
- 38th Academy Awards-Nominated for A Rage to Live. Lost to Darling.
