= Abraham Hirsch (architect) =

French architect

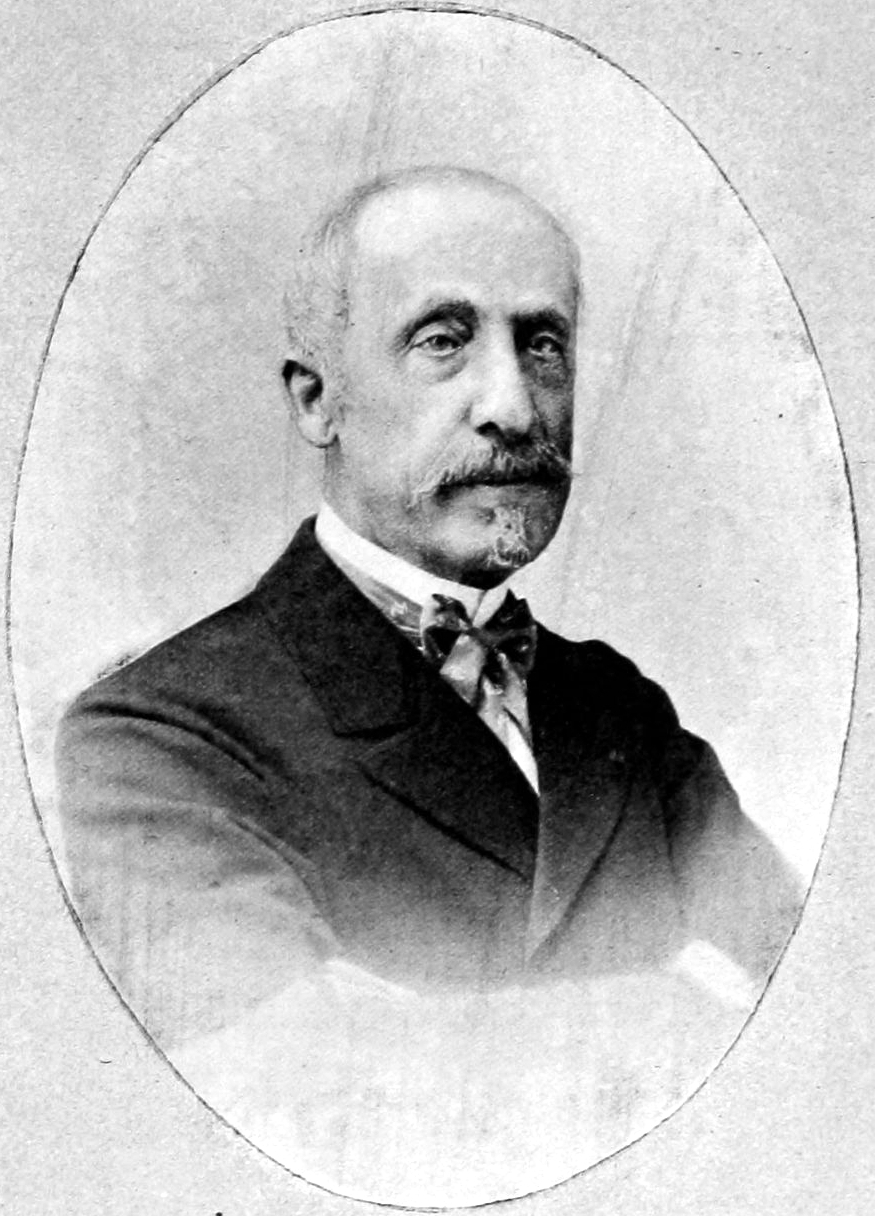
Abraham Hirsch Portrait

Abraham Hirsch (19 October 1828 – 11 December 1913) was a French architect operating in Lyon at the end of the nineteenth century. In 1871, he became the chief architect of Lyon and helped to design many buildings of the city, including the atrium, large amphitheatre, main courtyard, and reception room of the University of Lyon and many of its faculties. Hirsch assisted with the plans for the Synagogue of Besançon and under his supervision, the largest group of schools in Lyon was constructed.

== Biography and work ==
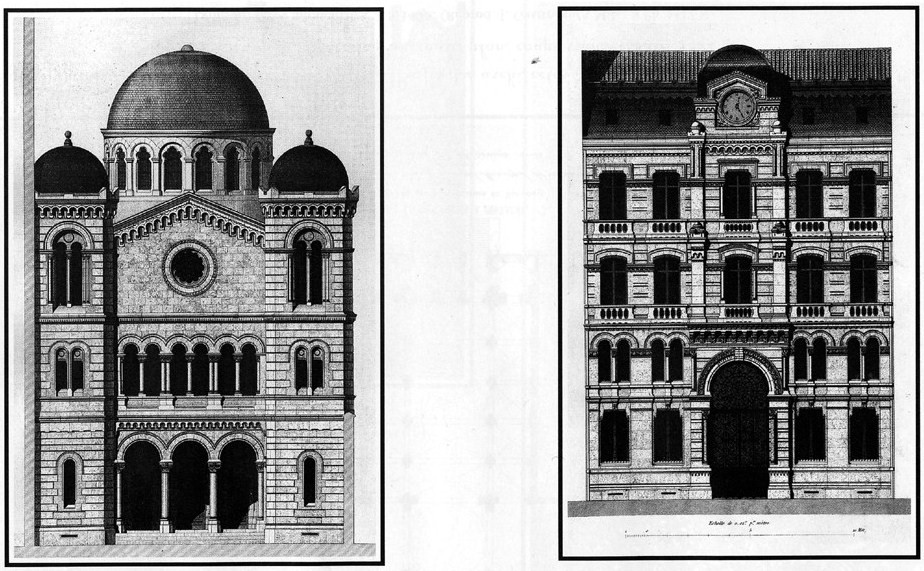
Architect's plan for the Grande synagogue de Lyon: The facade on the courtyard (left), the facade on the street (right). Lithograph by Lebel after Abraham Hirsch

Hirsch was born into a Jewish family of embroiderers on 19 October 1828, and attended school at "La Martinière". He studied architecture at the École nationale des beaux-arts de Lyon, and initially worked for Tony Desjardins, the chief architect of Lyon at that time. In 1871, he became the chief architect of Lyon. As chief architect of the city, he planned many buildings under the support of mayor Antoine Gailleton.

Prior to his appointment as chief architect of Lyon, he designed the Grande synagogue de Lyon, a building of Neo-Byzantine style.

He designed the École du service de santé des armées de Lyon-Bron, and the Faculty of Medicine, the Nursing School, and the Faculty of Law and Letters of the University of Lyon (History). He also designed the main courtyard, atrium, reception room and large amphitheatre of the university, which were inaugurated by President Félix Faure on 1 May 1896. From 1879 to 1887, Hirsch served as the architect for the astronomical and meteorological observatory of Lyon.

Under his supervision, the largest group of schools in Lyon was constructed: Croix-Rousse Boulevard, Berthelot Avenue, Jarente Street, Bossuet Street, Charlemagne, Pierre Corneille Street, and Chavant Street. He also assisted with the plans for the Synagogue of Besançon. He died on 11 December 1913, and received the Legion of Honour during his lifetime.
