= Marco Dezzi Bardeschi =

Italian architect (1934–2018)

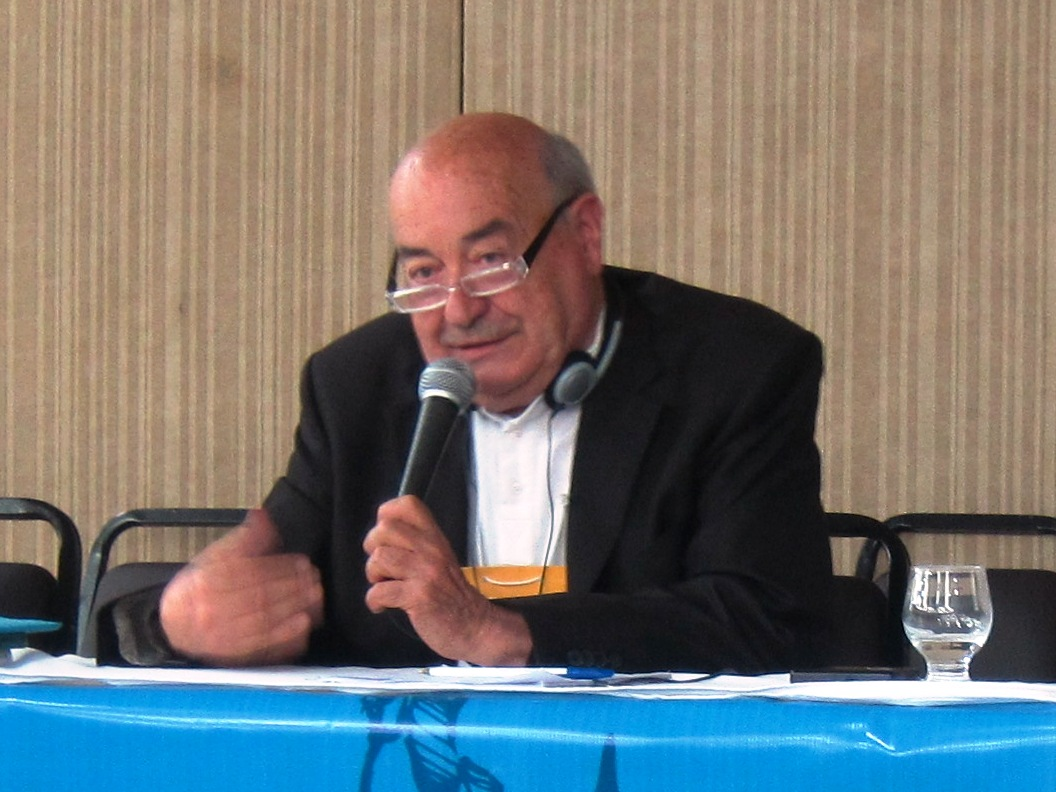
- Born: September 30, 1934; Florence, Italy
- Died: November 4, 2018 (aged 84)
- Occupation: Architect

Marco Dezzi Bardeschi (September 30, 1934 – November 4, 2018) was an Italian architect, academic and architectural conservation theorist. He was a professor of Architectural Restoration at the Polytechnic University of Milan and was associated with the Italian debate on architectural conservation and restoration.

== Career ==
After early work at the Soprintendenza of Arezzo, Dezzi Bardeschi taught and carried out research in Florence and later at the Polytechnic University of Milan. In 1980 he founded the Department for the Conservation of Architectural and Environmental Resources, which he directed until 1985. From 1983 to 1985 he coordinated the doctorate in conservation of architectural heritage at the Polytechnic University of Milan.

He was president of the Italian section of ICOMOS from 2003 to 2007. He also promoted and organized the Third International Travelling Exhibition of Monumental Restoration, shown in Rome in 2008 and in Naples in 2009.

== ’ANANKE ==
In 1993 Dezzi Bardeschi founded ’ANANKE, an architectural magazine devoted to culture, history and techniques of conservation for design, which he directed until his death.
