= George Vernon Russell =

American architect

- Born: September 4, 1905; San Bernardino, California, U.S.
- Died: March 17, 1989 (aged 83); Pasadena, California, U.S.
- Education: University of Washington
- Occupation: Architect
- Children: 2

George Vernon Russell (September 4, 1905 – March 17, 1989) was an American architect. He designed many residential properties and commercial buildings in Los Angeles, California. He also designed the masterplans and a library unit for the University of California, Riverside as well as the 1976 expansion of the Natural History Museum of Los Angeles County.

== Early life ==
George Vernon Russell was born on September 4, 1905, in San Bernardino, California. He attended the California Institute of Technology for a year and graduated from the University of Washington in Seattle, Washington. He also attended the École des Beaux-Arts at Fontainebleau in Fontainebleau, France in 1928.

== Career ==
Russell began his career as a draughtsman in New York City. With fellow architect Douglas Honnold, Russell designed the Alexander Kiam House in Los Angeles c. 1927. He also became a movie set designer in Los Angeles in 1933. A decade later, in 1937, Russell, Honnold and Arthur W. Hawes designed the Hollywood Reporter Building on Sunset Boulevard.

During World War II, Russell designed air bases and units for the United States Army in England and Ireland. After the war, he taught architecture at the University of Southern California. Meanwhile, in 1946, he was hired by William R. Wilkerson to design the Flamingo Hotel in Las Vegas, Nevada; however, when Meyer Lansky acquired the building, he replaced him with his own architectural team. Also in 1946, Russell and fellow architect Eduardo Jose Samaniego designed the JC Penney factory in Van Nuys.

In 1950, Russell designed the Joyce Shoe Company Factory in Los Angeles. He later designed the Republic Supply Co. building in San Leandro, for which he won awards at the 1953 Berlin Trade Fair in Germany. In 1952, he designed the Avery Adhesive Label Corporation Office Building in Monrovia, California. He also designed the John J. Pike House at 6675 Whitley Terrace in Hollywood, for which he won a Merit Award in the Single Family Residence Category from the American Institute of Architects in 1954. A few years later, he designed the Cate School in Carpinteria, for which he won the first prize from the Church Architectural Guild of America in 1958.

Russell designed the master plans of the University of California, Riverside, where he also designed the Library Unit II in 1963. By 1976, he designed a three-story, 56,000-square-foot expansion of the Natural History Museum of Los Angeles County.

Russell became a Fellow of the American Institute of Architects and served as the president of its Southern California chapter in 1958.

== Personal life and death ==
Russell was married in 1942, and he had two children. They lived in Pasadena, California. He died on March 17, 1989.
