= A. Quincy Jones =

American architect

- Born: April 29, 1913; Kansas City, Missouri, U.S.
- Died: August 3, 1979 (aged 66); Los Angeles, California, U.S.
- Education: University of Washington
- Occupation: Architect
- Buildings: Sunnylands; The Barn; Brody House

Archibald Quincy Jones FAIA (April 29, 1913 – August 3, 1979) was a Los Angeles–based architect and educator known for innovative buildings in the modernist style and for urban planning that pioneered the use of greenbelts and green design.

== Childhood and early career ==
Jones was born in Kansas City, Missouri, in 1913. He was raised in the city of Gardena in Southern California, but finished high school in Seattle. Afterwards he enrolled in the University of Washington program in architecture, where he was particularly influenced by faculty member Lionel Pries, and graduated with Bachelor of Architecture (B.Arch.) in 1936.

After marrying a fellow architecture student (Ruth Schneider), Jones returned to Los Angeles, working first in the offices of the modernist architects Douglas Honnold and George Vernon Russell from 1936 to 1937, and Burton A. Schutt from 1937 to 1939.

He worked for Allied Engineers, Inc. of San Pedro from 1940 to 1942, where he met the architect Frederick Emmons, with whom he would later partner. Jones was responsible for the development and layout of Roosevelt Base in San Pedro and the Naval Reserve Air Base in Los Alamitos.

In 1942, Jones received his California architect certification, divorced and received a commission as a lieutenant commander in the United States Navy. He was assigned to the aircraft carrier USS Lexington, which was serving in the Pacific theater.

== Architecture office ==
Discharged from the Navy in 1945, Jones returned to Los Angeles and opened an architectural office in one of the two buildings of the house in Laurel Canyon he had built with his former wife. On his first day in business Jones had secured his first client.

The years after the war saw Jones partnering with Paul R. Williams on several projects in the Palm Springs area. These include the Palm Springs Tennis Club (1947), the Town & Country restaurant (1948), and the restaurant Romanoff's On the Rocks (1950). Jones also participated in John Entenza's Case Study House program.

The December 1950 issue of the magazine Architectural Forum featured a "Builder's House of the Year" designed by A. Quincy Jones. The same issue also awarded the innovative Palo Alto building magnate Joseph Eichler "Subdivision of the Year". Eichler then invited Jones to tour the Palo Alto development he had just completed where he suggested to Jones that the Builder of the Year join forces with the Architect of the Year. This relationship continued until Eichler's death in 1974.

It was through this relationship that Jones was provided both the venue and the freedom to implement his concepts of incorporating park-like common areas in tract housing developments. His were some of the first greenbelts incorporated into moderate income tract housing in the United States. In 1960, Jones was hired by William Pereira as a planning partner in the development of the city of Irvine, California, which has since become a model for the integration of greenbelts into urban development.

The Eichler commission prompted Jones to form a partnership with his prewar acquaintance, architect Frederick Emmons. The Jones and Emmons partnership lasted from 1951 until Emmons' retirement in 1969. Their designs are reflected in some 5,000 of Eichler's homes, by Emmons' estimate. Jones and Emmons were awarded national AIA Firm of the Year in 1969.

== Teaching and influence ==
Jones was also a professor and later dean of architecture in the USC School of Architecture at the University of Southern California from 1951 until his death in 1979. By the 1960s Jones was designing a number of university campus buildings and larger office buildings, including the 1963 IBM Aerospace Headquarters in Westchester, California. Several University of California campuses feature significant examples of Jones' work. In 1966, Jones designed "Sunnylands," the 200 acre (2.6 km^{2}) estate and 32,000 square foot (3,000 m^{2}) home of Walter Annenberg in Rancho Mirage, California.

Jones raised the tract house in California from the simple stucco box to a logically designed structure integrated into the landscape and surrounded by greenbelts. He introduced new materials as well as a new way of living within the built environment and popularized an informal, outdoor-oriented open plan. More than just abstractions of the suburban ranch house, most Jones and Emmons designs incorporated a usable atrium, high ceilings, post-and-beam construction and walls of glass. For the postwar moderate-income family, his work bridged the gap between custom-built and developer-built homes.

Jones often took advantage of industrial prefabricated units to provide affordable yet refined architecture. His larger buildings brought innovations to the integration of mechanical systems, improving their efficiency and maximizing retrievable space. Jones' aesthetic style, precise detailing and siting made his buildings quintessential embodiments of mid-century American architecture.

== Legacy ==
In 2013, a Hammer Museum exhibition entitled "A. Quincy Jones: Building for Better Living," redressed what curators had until then considered a major omission in the history of Los Angeles Modernism. An exhibition catalogue, now out of print, was published at the same time.

Several of his buildings are listed by the Los Angeles Conservancy.

== Significant buildings ==
- 1938 Jones House and Studio, 8661 Nash, West Hollywood, Los Angeles, California
- 1947 Palm Springs Tennis Club Addition, with Paul R. Williams. Palm Springs, California
- 1948
  - Pueblo Gardens housing development, for developer Del Webb, Tucson, Arizona
  - The Center, a.k.a. Town & Country Restaurant, with Paul R. Williams. 300 South Palm Canyon Drive, Palm Springs, California. (altered)
  - Romanoff's on the Rocks, Palm Springs, California (altered)
  - Nordlinger House, 11492 Thurston Circle, Bel Air, Los Angeles, California
- 1950
  - Brody House, 360 South Mapleton Drive, Holmby Hills, Los Angeles, California
  - Mutual Housing Association Development (Crestwood Hills), with Smith and Contini. Los Angeles, California
  - Hvistendahl House, San Diego
  - Andrew Fuller House, Charron Lane, Fort Worth, Texas
  - The Barn (Los Angeles) Los Angeles, California
- 1951 Campbell Hall School, 4717 Laurel Canyon, North Hollywood, California
- 1951 The Howard G. Wilson House, 2718 N Beverly Glen blvd, Los Angeles, California, 90077
- 1952 House, Bienveneda and Marquette Streets, Pacific Palisades, California
- 1953 House, 503 N Oakhurst Drive, Beverly Hills, California (destroyed by new owner circa 1995.) (According to Property Shark and several other realty websites, the house at this address was built in 2005, so the new owner either held onto the property for 10 years, or Wikipedia date is incorrect. According to Jones' collection at UCLA the home was built in 1951.)
- 1954
  - Emmons House, 661 Brooktree, Pacific Palisades, California
  - U.S. Gypsum Research Village House, Barrington, Illinois
- 1955 Jones House, 1223 Tigertail Road, Los Angeles (destroyed by fire)
- 1956 Eichler Steel House X-100, San Mateo, California
- 1957 Lido Sands Development, [Newport Beach, California] (82 houses)
- 1959
  - Biological Sciences Building, University of California, Santa Barbara
  - Trousdale Estates home, Beverly Hills, California
  - Matt and Lyda Kahn house, Stanford, California
- 1960 Faculty Center, University of Southern California Los Angeles, California
- 1961 Case Study House No. 24, Chatsworth, California (unbuilt)
- 1963 Shorecliff Tower Apartments (now called Ocean Aire), 535 Ocean Avenue, Santa Monica, California
- 1964
  - Joseph Eichler Housing Development, Granada Hills, California
  - University Research Library, unit I, University of California, Los Angeles, California
  - Laguna Eichler Apartments, 66 Cleary Court, San Francisco, California
  - Joseph Eichler Housing Development, Thousand Oaks, California
  - Long Beach Naval Station Family Housing, Long Beach, California
  - California State University, Dominguez Hills campus master plan, Carson, California
- 1965
  - University of California, Irvine (partnership with William Pereira)
  - Country Club Estates, Palm Springs, California. Designated a Palm Springs Historic District in 2024. (30 homes)
- 1966
  - Walter Annenberg Estate "Sunnylands", Rancho Mirage, California
  - Carillon Tower, University of California, Riverside, California
  - Edward Chiles Residence, Shady Oaks Lane, Fort Worth, Texas
  - Faircourt Housing Subdivision, Palo Alto, California
- 1967 Chemistry Building, University of California, Riverside, California
- 1971 Research Library, unit II, University of California, Los Angeles, California
- 1975 Mandeville Center for the Arts, University of California, La Jolla, San Diego, California
- 1976 USC Annenberg School for Communication and Journalism, unit I, University of Southern California, Los Angeles California
- 1979 USC Annenberg School for Communication and Journalism, unit II, University of Southern California, Los Angeles California.
