= USC School of Architecture =

Architecture school at the University of Southern California

Coordinates: 34.019155°N 118.288026°W

- Type: Private
- Established: 1914
- Parent institution: University of Southern California
- Academic affiliations: NAAB
- Dean: Brett Steele
- Associate Dean: Amy L. Murphy; Trudi Sandmeier
- Academic staff: 112
- Undergraduates: 500
- Postgraduates: 200
- Location: Los Angeles, California, United States
- Campus: Urban
- Colors: Cardinal and Gold
- Website: arch.usc.edu

The USC School of Architecture is the architecture school at the University of Southern California. Located in Los Angeles, California, it is one of the university's twenty-two professional schools, offering both undergraduate and graduate degrees in the fields of architecture, building science, landscape architecture and heritage conservation.

The USC School of Architecture has enrolled over 6,500 alumni. Since its founding as a department in 1914, the school has produced some of the world's leading architects, including Frank Gehry, Paul R. Williams, Pierre Koenig and Thom Mayne, among others. The current dean of the school is Brett Steele and faculty includes notable architects including Alvin Huang, Wes Jones, Lorcan O'Herlihy and Lawrence Scarpa.

== History ==
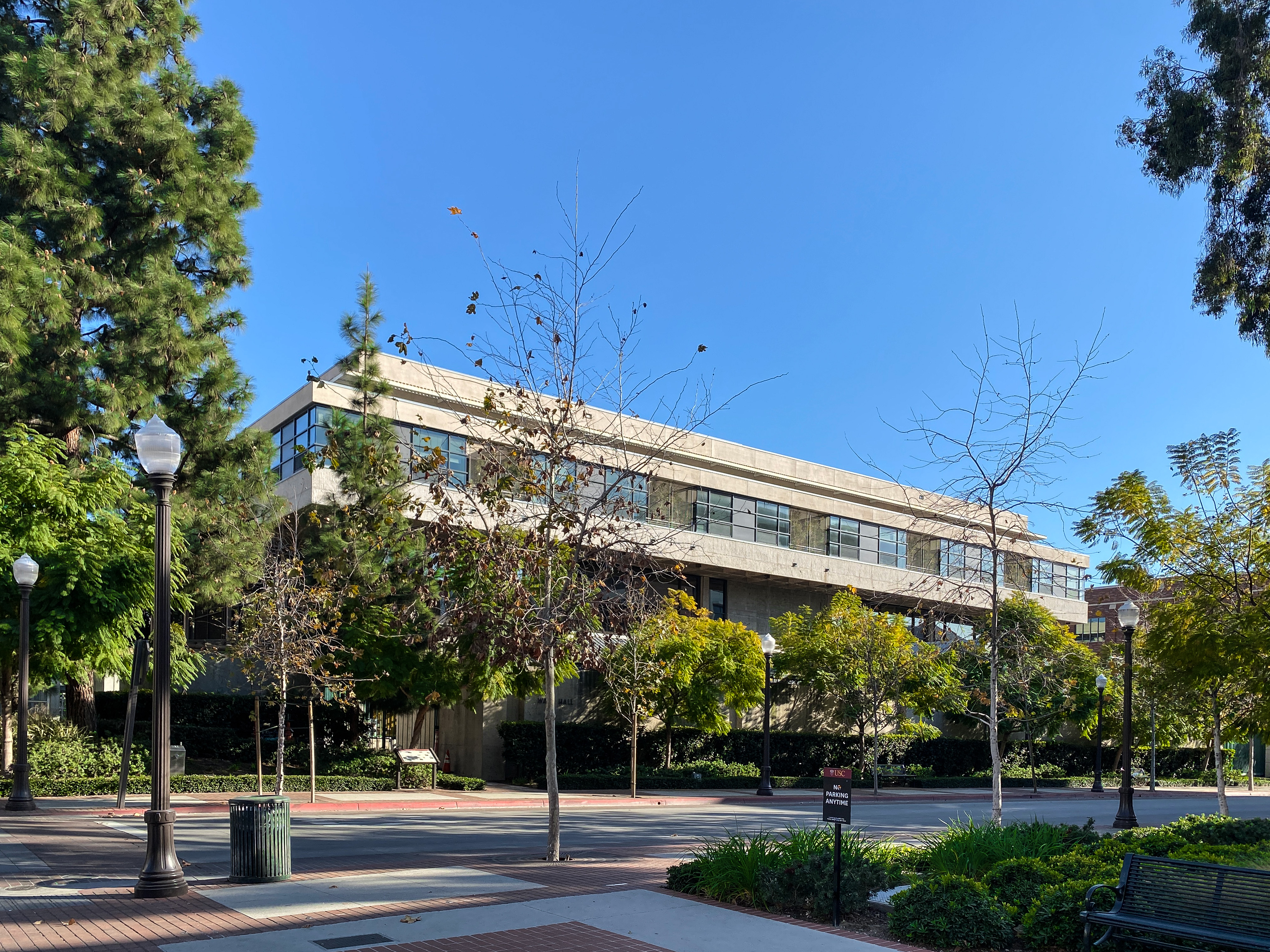
Watt Hall, built in 1974 by USC architecture alumnus Edward Killingsworth

The program at USC began as an architecture department in 1914. Soon after, with the help of the Allied Architects of Los Angeles, a separate School of Architecture was established in 1925. By 1928, majors and degree-granting programs were provided to students. One of the earliest undergraduate programs was the 5-year professional Bachelor of Architecture program.

The current main buildings are Watt Hall & Harris Hall. Watt Hall was built in 1974 and designed by alumnus Edward Killingsworth ('40).

In 1966, USC Architecture took over maintenance of the Gamble House, the Craftsman masterpiece in Pasadena designed by Greene and Greene in 1966 in a joint deed with the city of Pasadena, which took over responsibility for the grounds. In November 2019, ownership was transferred to the Gamble House Conservancy run by the city of Pasadena.

The school also owned the Samuel Freeman House, a Frank Lloyd Wright designed house in the Hollywood Hills of Los Angeles built in 1923. USC Architecture sold the home to real estate developer Richard Weintraub in 2022. The Freeman house was listed on the National Register of Historic Places in 1971. The house has also been listed as a California Historical Landmark #1011, and as Los Angeles Historic-Cultural Monument #247 in 1981.

== Fields of study ==
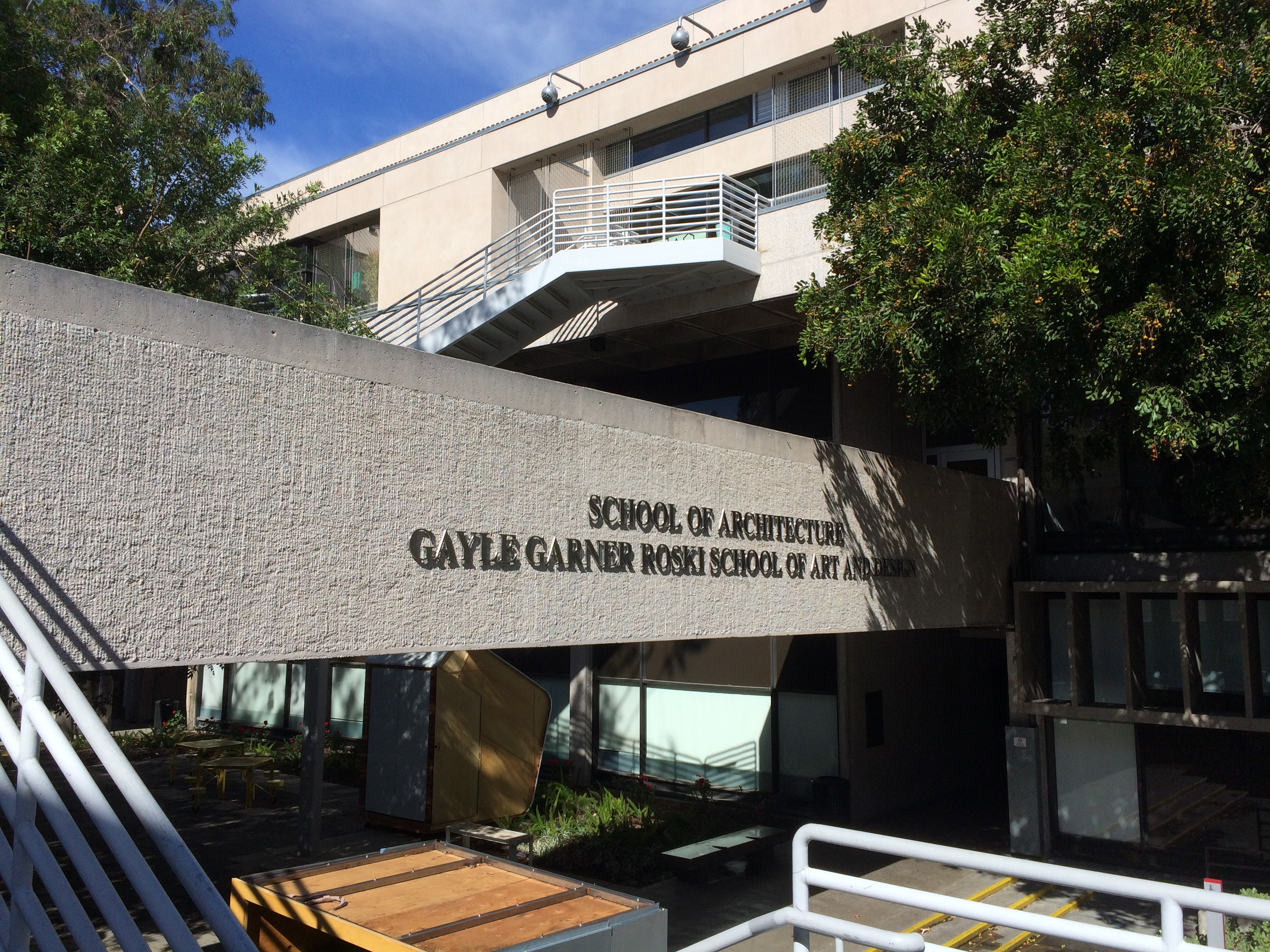
Watt Hall houses the School of Architecture as well as the Roski School of Art and Design

The school offers three undergraduate degrees, three undergraduate minors, six master's degrees, five dual degrees, and nine certificate programs.

=== Undergraduate architecture ===
The undergraduate "B. Arch" is accredited by the National Architectural Accrediting Board.

=== Graduate architecture ===
The graduate "M. Arch" is accredited by the National Architectural Accrediting Board. As an accredited professional degree, the M.Arch provides firm grounding knowledge in history, technology, professional practice and theory. The separate Master of Advanced Architecture Studies (MAAS) is a post-professional degree for those who already have a Bachelor of Architecture degree.

=== Graduate heritage conservation ===
The graduate heritage conservation curriculum is designed to expose students to the full breadth of the profession, including "...materials conservation, policy and planning, conservation theory, global conservation efforts, architectural and landscape history, best-practices in resource documentation and evaluation, sustainability, and historic site management."

=== Graduate landscape architecture and urbanism ===
Landscape architecture at USC is a design-centered program centered on a trans-disciplinary approach. The Master of Landscape Architecture is accredited by the Landscape Architectural Accreditation Board (LAAB).

=== Graduate building science ===
The Master of Building Science (MBS) degree program was recognized as a "top-notch program" by Architect Magazine: Journal of the American Institute of Architects, in 2009. Building science focuses on the relationship of the human condition and to natural forces. The USC Chase L. Leavitt Graduate Building Science program emphasizes the breadth of technology in architecture, including structures, building systems, analytical computing and BIM, building envelopes, design theories and methods, human comfort, sustainability, acoustics, lighting and daylighting.

== Facilities ==
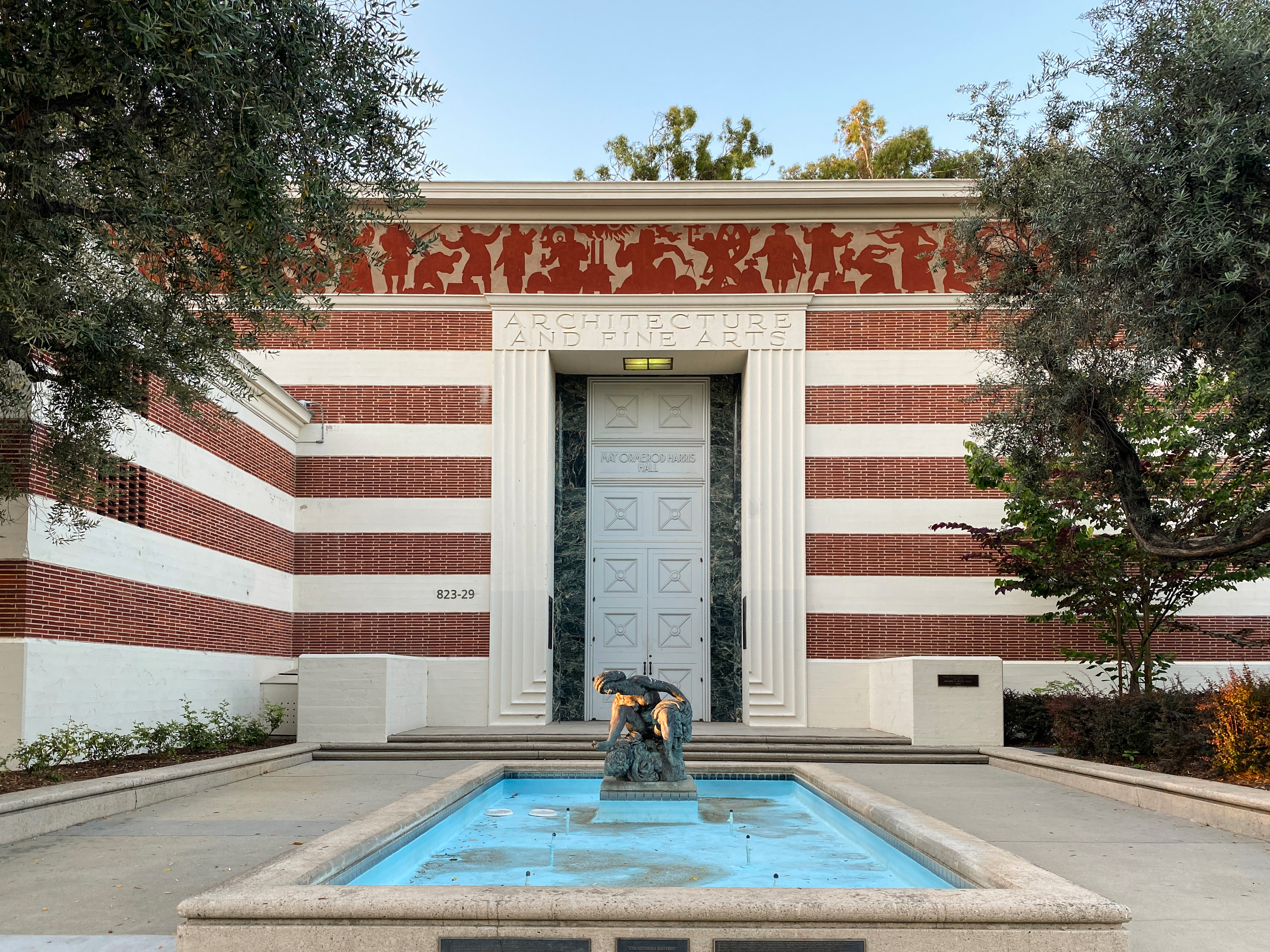
Harris Hall, USC School of Architecture

The School of Architecture is located in the Harris Hall and Watt Hall Complex, at the southern end of the USC University Park Campus. The school comprises over 50,000 square feet (4,600 m^{2}) of design studios, classrooms, galleries, workshops and labs. Students in the USC School of Architecture have their own 24-7 personal workstations. Students have access to their projects at all times. Watt Hall contains one of the best regional architecture libraries, and is home to extensive woodshop and fabrication facilities. The complex also houses several gallery review spaces and, next door, the "USC Fisher Museum of Art".

== Faculty ==
- Steven Ehrlich - FAIA
- Diane Ghirardo - Ph.D.
- Alvin Huang - AIA
- Wes Jones - RA, FAAR
- Karen M. Kensek
- Aaron Neubert - FAIA
- Douglas E. Noble - FAIA, Ph.D.
- Victor A. Regnier FAIA
- Lawrence Scarpa - FAIA
- Marc Eugene Schiler - FASES, LC
- Doris Sung
- Patrick Tighe - FAIA

Notable Former Faculty:

- Gregory Ain - Best known for bringing elements of modern architecture to lower and medium-cost housing.
- Reyner Banham
- Craig Ellwood
- A. Quincy Jones - Professor and later Dean of the School of Architecture from 1951-1967. Designed the building which houses the USC Annenberg School for Communication and Journalism.
- Calvin C. Straub - Professor & Dean, Considered the father of California Post & Beam architecture. Early inventor of Mid-Century modernism with other USC faculty-Case Study Architect.
- Pierre Koenig
- Ralph Lewis Knowles
- Raymond Loewy - internationally acclaimed industrial designer.
- Richard Neutra - Considered among the most important modernist architects.
- Lorcan O'Herlihy - FAIA
- William L. Pereira - Joined faculty in 1949. Notable works include the Transamerica Pyramid in San Francisco and Geisel Library at UC San Diego. Designed the campus plans of USC, UC Irvine, and Pepperdine University.

== Alumni ==
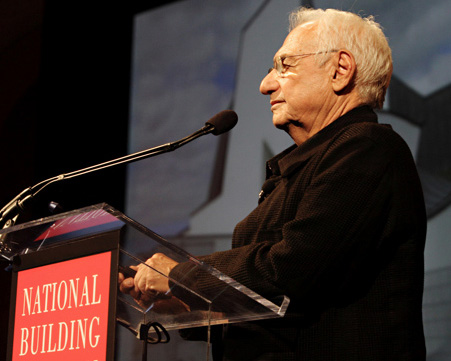
Frank Gehry (B.Arch 1954), architecture alumnus

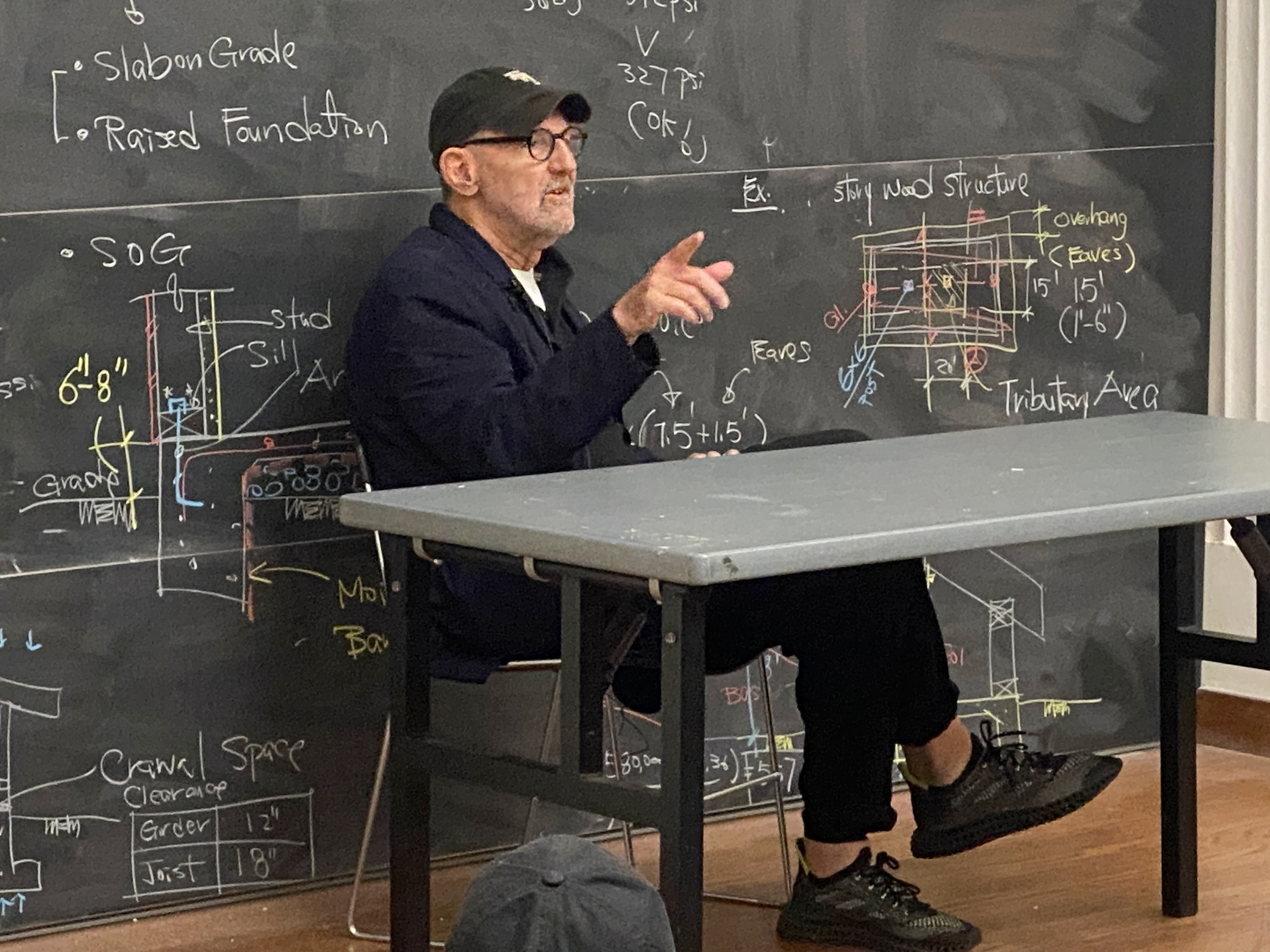
Thom Mayne (B.Arch 1968), co-founder and principal of Morphosis Architects

Many of the students that have graduated from the USC School of Architecture have moved on to be leading figures in the architectural community.

- Gregory Ain - Attended the School from 1927-1928. Former professor at the USC School of Architecture and Dean of the school of architecture at Pennsylvania State University.
- Barry Berkus - B. Arch. Designed more than 600,000 houses.
- Conrad Buff III - Partner in architecture firm Buff, Smith and Hensman
- Boris Dramov - B. Arch, 1966. Notable works include Martin Luther King, Jr. Memorial and Third Street Promenade.
- Behnaz Farahi - M. Arch, 2012. Interactive designer and creative technologist.
- Frank O. Gehry - B. Arch, 1954. Notable works include the Guggenheim Museum Bilbao, Walt Disney Concert Hall, Experience Music Project, and Dancing House. Pritzker Prize laureate.
- Donald C. Hensman - Partner in architecture firm Buff, Smith and Hensman
- Alvin Huang - B.Arch 1998. Principal in architecture firm Synthesis Design + Architecture. Associate Professor at the USC School of Architecture.
- Jon Jerde - B. Arch, 1966. Notable works include Canal City Hakata, Mall of America, Westfield Horton Plaza, the Bellagio (resort), and Universal CityWalk in Los Angeles.
- Edward Killingsworth - B. Arch. 1940. Participated in the Case Study Houses experiment. Master planning architect for California State University, Long Beach for over 40 years. Designed Watt Hall and the University Religious Center at USC.
- Pierre Koenig - B. Arch, 1952.
- William Krisel - B.Arch 1949. noted mid-century modern architect
- Mark Lee - B.Arch 1991. Partner in architecture firm JohnstonMarkLee. Appointed the chair of the department of architecture at Harvard University Graduate School of Design in 2018.
- Anthony A. Marnell II - B.Arch, 1972. Founder of Marnell Corrao Associates, a design-build company responsible for the design and construction of numerous Las Vegas casinos, including the Wynn Las Vegas and the Bellagio.
- Thom Mayne - B. Arch, 1968. Notable works include the Caltrans District 7 Headquarters and the San Francisco Federal Building. Pritzker Prize laureate.
- Albert Nozaki - B. Arch, 1933. Academy-Award nominated art director for Paramount Pictures. Known for work on The War of the Worlds and The Ten Commandments. Career was disrupted when he was interned at Manzanar during World War II.
- Raphael Soriano - B. Arch, 1934.
- Calvin C. Straub - B. Arch, 1943.
- Paul Revere Williams - B. Arch, 1934. Designed homes for numerous celebrities including Frank Sinatra, Lucille Ball, and Desi Arnaz. First African American member and Fellow of the American Institute of Architects. Recipient of the 2017 AIA Gold Medal.
- Zelma Wilson - B. Arch, 1947.
