= Douglas E. Noble =

American architect

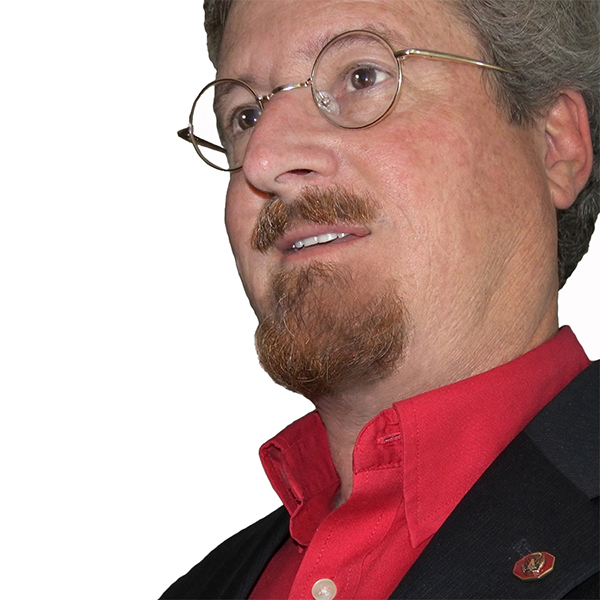
- Douglas E. Noble, Ph.D., FAIA
- Born: Miami, Florida, U.S.
- Known for: Architectural Computing, Building Science, Architecture Education, Design Theories and Methods
- Title: Architect

Academic work
- Discipline: Architecture, Building Science
- Institutions: University of California at Berkeley, University of Southern California, Facade Tectonics Institute, CLIPPER Lab

Douglas E. Noble is an American architect and tenured professor at the USC School of Architecture. He is a fellow of the American Institute of Architects, and a Distinguished Professor of the Association of Collegiate Schools of Architecture. He is known for his work in four overlapping arenas: Architectural Computing, Building Science, Architecture Education, and Design Theories and Methods. He received the ACSA/AIAS New Faculty Teaching Award in 1995, the ACSA Creative Achievement Award in 2013, and the ACSA Practice and Leadership Award in 2023. He was named among the "10 most admired educators" nationally in architecture in 2010 and was twice more selected as a "most admired educator" in 2015 and 2018. He is the recipient of the 2017 American Institute of Architects Los Angeles Chapter Presidential Honor as educator of the year, and the 2014 AIA California Chapter Educator Award.

== Early career ==
Noble completed a Bachelor of Science in Architecture and a Bachelor of Architecture at California State Polytechnic University, Pomona, and both a Master of Architecture and Ph.D. at the University of California at Berkeley. His doctoral dissertation built on the work of Horst Rittel by creating a computer supported Issue-based information system. Noble taught for a few years at UC Berkeley and then joined the faculty of the USC School of Architecture in 1991. Noble has taught at USC since 1991, focusing on architectural computing, building science, and design theories and methods. He has written more than 100 articles, and collaborated with noted architects and educators, including Pierre Koenig, Horst Rittel, Karen M. Kensek, Marc Eugene Schiler, and Ralph Lewis Knowles.

== Later career ==
Noble has served two terms as Associate Dean of the USC School of Architecture (2007–2009 and 2019–2022). He founded the PhD program in Architecture and served as Director of the Graduate Building Science program for many years.

=== Architectural computing ===
With Karen M. Kensek, he founded the CLIPPER Lab at USC in 1991 in support of research and education in architectural computing. With Karen Kensek, he conducted early architecture design studio experiments including a "supercomputing studio" in 1988 (among the first design studio to use a Cray Supercomputer in support of a design studio) and one of the first fully "paperless studios" in 1993. After serving as Editor of the ACADIA Quarterly for four years, he was elected president of the ACADIA (Association for Computer Aided Design In Architecture) in 1998.

=== Building science and facade tectonics ===
With Kensek and Mic Patterson, he founded the Facade Tectonics Institute in 2007 as a university-based research and education organization. The Facade Tectonics Institute has hosted dozens of conferences and published hundreds of research papers focusing on research in building facade technology. He received a Graham Foundation Grant in 2011 for research related to the Samuel Freeman House, a residence designed in 1924 by Frank Lloyd Wright.

=== Architecture education ===
Together, Noble and Kensek have received several awards for their innovative "NotLY: Not Licensed Yet" support system for individuals preparing for the Architect Registration Examination. In addition to completing several buildings as an architect, Noble is a widely recognized leader in championing and mentoring emerging architecture professionals. Noble founded the Ph.D. program at USC Architecture, and he has published articles and organized symposia on doctoral education in architecture.

=== Design theories and methods ===
Noble completed a Ph.D. in the Design Theories and Methods (DTM) group at UC Berkeley. His dissertation focused on implementing an early computer-supported issue-based information system (IBIS), and he was a co-author on a research paper on IBIS with his dissertation chair Horst Rittel.

=== Design–build: the Carapace Pavilion ===
Funded by a grant from the PCI Foundation and Clark Pacific, and in partnership with students at the USC School of Architecture, Noble and the team designed, fabricated, and installed the Carapace Pavilion in Joshua Tree National Park. The project has received multiple awards, including from the American Institute of Architects and the Precast / Prestressed Concrete Institute.

== Published works ==
Books:

- Building Information Modeling: BIM in Current and Future Practice. With Karen M. Kensek. Wiley. (2014) ISBN 9781118766309
- The Frank Lloyd Wright Freeman House Archive: Volumes 1–7. With Ben McAlister, Karen M. Kensek, and Celeste Rodriguez. Clipper Lab Press / Graham Foundation for Advanced Studies in the Fine Arts (2014)

Edited Journals and Conference Proceedings:

- Computer Supported Design in Architecture: Mission, Method, Madness. Conference Proceedings, ACADIA (1992) with Karen M. Kensek.
- The ACADIA Quarterly, The Association for Computer-Aided Design in Architecture, 1993–1997
- Issue-Based Information Systems for Design: Issues, Positions, Arguments. Volumes 1 and 2. With Karen M. Kensek. Clipper Lab (1995)
- Facade Tectonics: The Building Envelope. The Journal of the Facade Tectonics Institute, With Karen M. Kensek. 2007–2017
- Face Time: The Emergence of the Facade as the Integrative Factor in Holistic Building Design, Proceedings of the 2016 World Congress Conference of the Facade Tectonics Institute, Volumes 1 and 2, With Karen M. Kensek and Shreya Das. Los Angeles, 2016.

Catalog:

- Software for Architects: The Guide to Computer Applications for the Architecture Profession. With Karen M. Kensek. 1992

Video:

- USC Living History Project – Ralph Lewis Knowles (2012)
- USC Living History Project – Robert S. Harris (2016)
