= Ralph Lewis Knowles =

American academic (1928–2024)

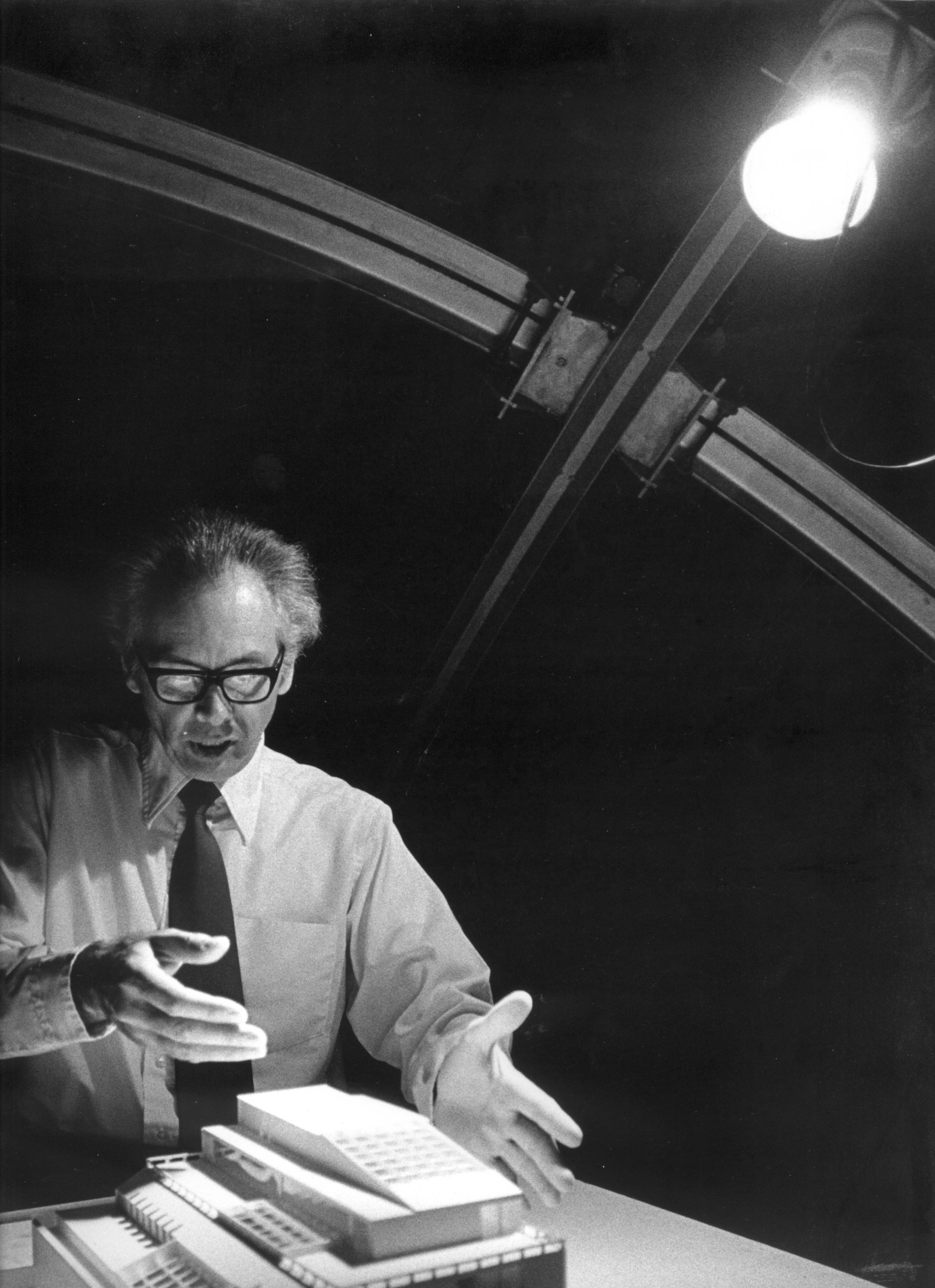
- Knowles and his Heliodon
- Born: December 9, 1928; Cleveland, Ohio, U.S.
- Died: August 23, 2024 (aged 95); Cleveland, Ohio, U.S.
- Known for: Solar envelopes, design for natural forces
- Title: Professor Emeritus
- Spouse: Mary Elizabeth Rogers Knowles

Academic work
- Discipline: Architecture, building science
- Institutions: Auburn University, University of Southern California

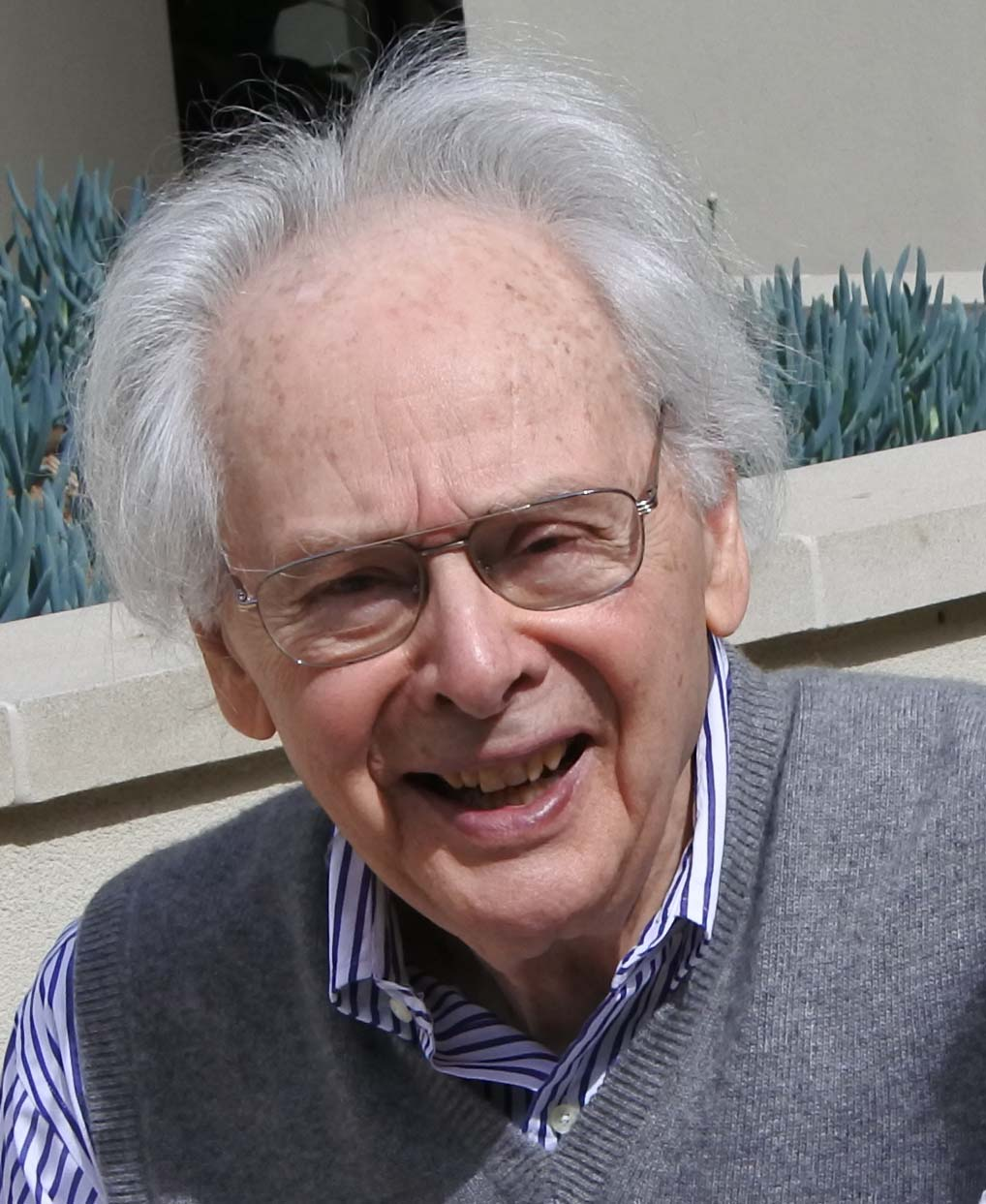
Knowles in 2016

Ralph Lewis Knowles (December 9, 1928 – August 23, 2024) was an American academic who was a professor emeritus of architecture and a leading theorist of solar access design. He created the concept of the "solar envelope" and championed solar access planning. The solar envelope has influenced many city design and planning documents. He was a fellow of the American Solar Energy Society and an ACSA Distinguished Professor. He received the prestigious AIA Medal for research in 1974.

== Early career ==
After serving in the United States Navy from 1946 to 1948, Knowles completed a Bachelor of Architecture at North Carolina State University in 1954, and a Master of Architecture at MIT in 1959. Knowles taught briefly at Auburn University from 1959 to 1963 and then joined the faculty of the USC School of Architecture at the University of Southern California.

In 1962, Knowles applied for a Graham Foundation grant to support his research on natural forces. The research hypothesis was that “A building made in balanced response to natural forces will exhibit differentiation useful for essential orientation in the urban landscape.” Knowles organized the natural forces laboratory at USC, and collaborated with noted architects and educators, including Pierre Koenig, Emmett Wemple, Konrad Wachsmann, Karen M. Kensek and Douglas E. Noble.

== Later career ==
Knowles taught at USC for 40 years, writing seven books and more than 50 articles. He served as interim dean of the school from 1973 to 1975. He presented his work at more than half of the schools of architecture in the United States.

Though officially retired, Knowles continued to participate at USC as a studio advisor and research consultant in the Chase L. Leavitt Graduate Building Science program.

His position as a leading voice in solar access design was acknowledged by the American Institute of Architects Medal for Research, and through his Fellowship award and honor as a “Passive Solar Pioneer” by the American Solar Energy Society (ASES). He conducted groundbreaking work establishing the concept of the solar envelope, becoming recognized as a global leader for solar access design. In the 1990s, he received a Fulbright Fellowship and spent a year teaching in eastern Europe. In September 2016, the Graduate School of Design (GSD) at Harvard University conducted a conference titled "heliomorphism" based on his work . Knowles was featured in an article in Metropolis Magazine in January 2017.

== Death ==
Knowles died in Altadena, California, on August 23, 2024, at the age of 95.

== Published works ==
Books:

- Energy and Form: An Ecological Approach to Urban Growth. MIT Press. (1974, Paperback ed. 1977) ISBN 9780262110501
- Solar Envelope Concepts: Moderate Density Building Applications. Solar Energy Research Institute (SERI). (1979, with Richard D. Berry).
- Sun Rhythm Form. MIT Press. (1981, Paperback ed. 1985) ISBN 9780262110785
- Energia E Forma. Padua, Italy: Franco Muzzio c. editore. Paperback. (1981, Italian translation of Energy and Form.)
- Ritual House: Drawing on nature’s rhythms for architecture and urban design. Island Press. (2006) ISBN 9781597260503

Selected papers:

- "The solar envelope: its meaning for energy and buildings." Energy and Buildings 35.1 (2003): 15-25.
- The Interstitium: A zoning strategy for seasonally adaptive architecture." (2000, co-authored with Karen M. Kensek) Proceedings of the Environmental Design Research Association (EDRA)
