= John Norton House =

Historic house in California, United States

- U.S. National Register of Historic Places
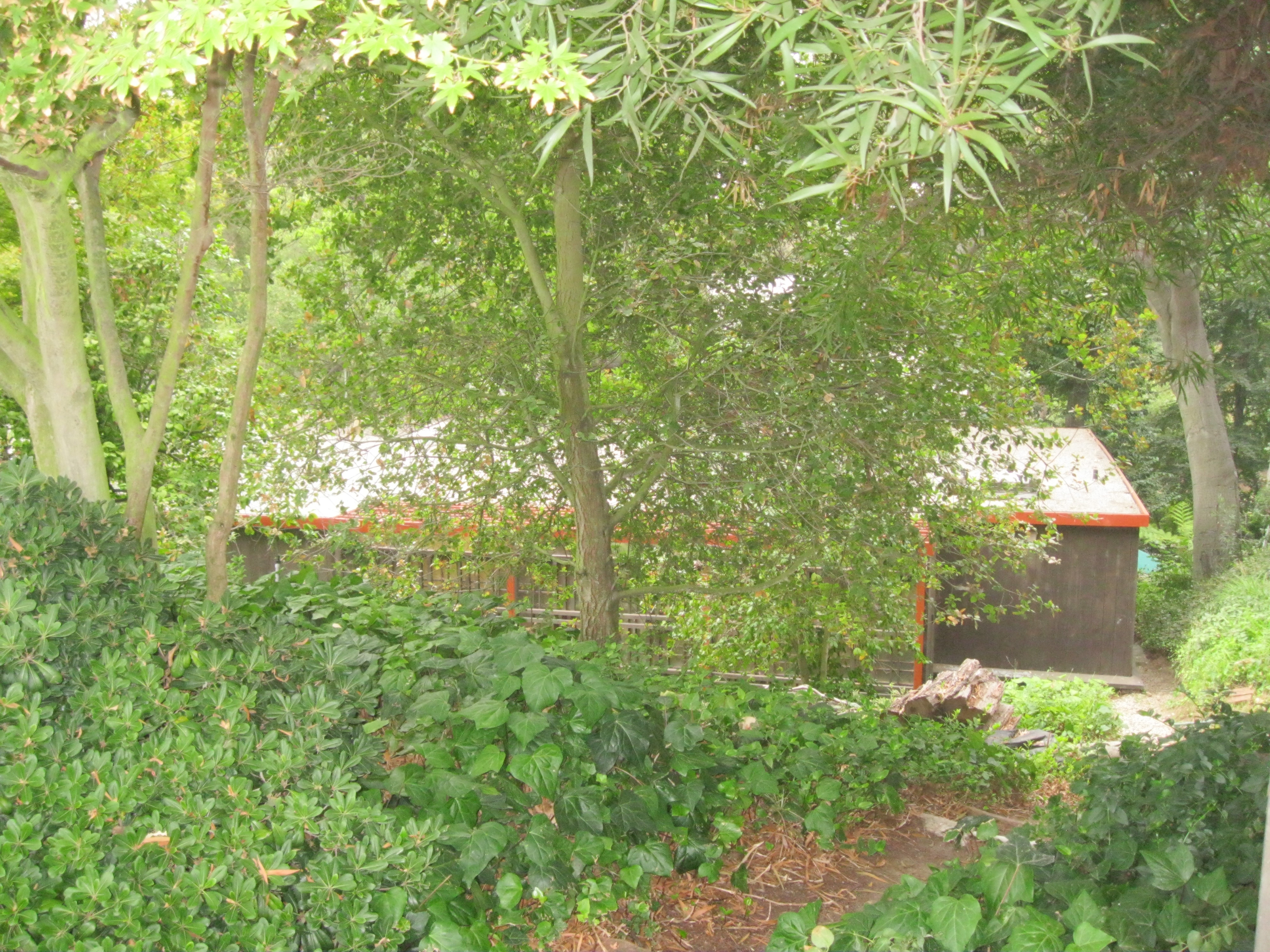
- The house in its natural surroundings

- Location within the Los Angeles metropolitan area Location within California Location within the United States
- Location: 820 Burleigh Dr., Pasadena, California
- Coordinates: 34°7′43″N 118°10′23″W
- Area: 0.3 acres (0.12 ha)
- Built: 1954
- Architect: Buff, Straub, & Hensman
- Architectural style: Modern Movement
- MPS: Cultural Resources of the Recent Past, City of Pasadena
- NRHP reference No.: 09000179
- Added to NRHP: April 10, 2009

The John Norton House is a historic house located at 820 Burleigh Drive in Pasadena, California. Built in 1954, the Modernist house was designed by Buff, Straub, and Hensman. The house is located in an arroyo below street level and is integrated with the surrounding nature, including a stream which flows past the front door. The house has a post-and-beam structure and features an open interior plan, a large deck, and large groups of exterior windows.

The house was added to the National Register of Historic Places on April 10, 2009.

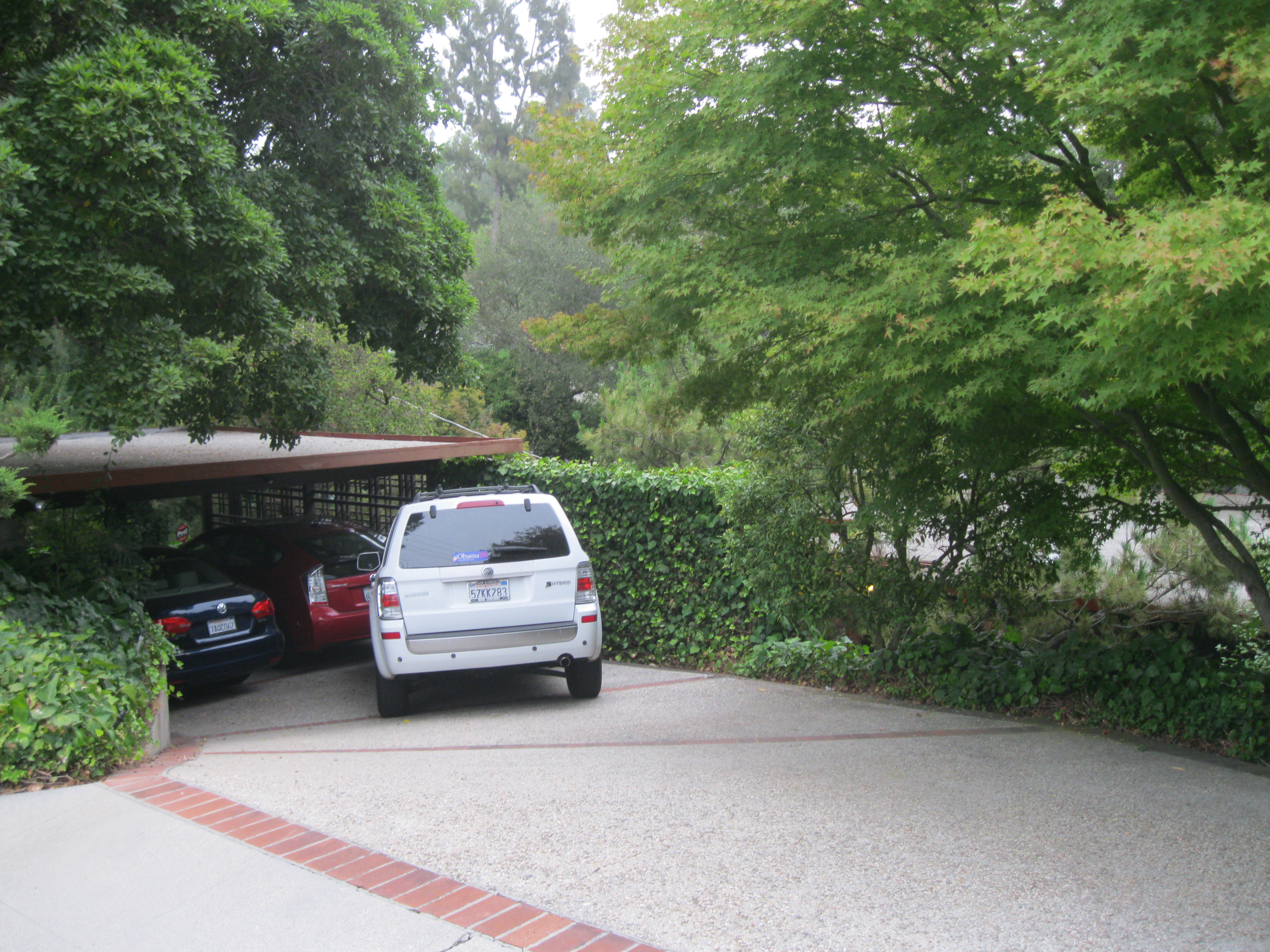
The house's adjacent garage
