= Conrad Buff =

Conrad Buff may refer to:

- Conrad Buff II (1886–1975), artist and children's book illustrator
- Conrad Buff III (1926–1989), architect, principal of Buff, Smith and Hensman
- Conrad Buff IV (1948—), film editor
