= Karen M. Kensek =

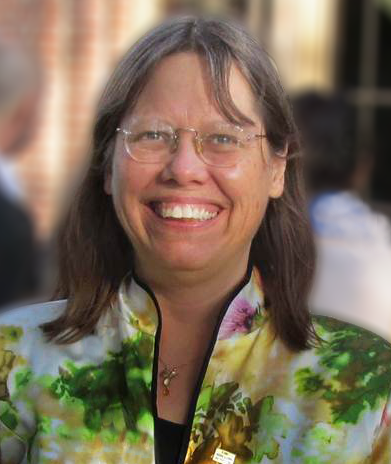
- Karen M. Kensek
- Born: United States
- Known for: Architectural Computing, Building Information Modeling, Building Science
- Title: Faculty

Academic work
- Discipline: Architecture, Building Science
- Institutions: University of California at Berkeley, University of Southern California, Facade Tectonics Institute, CLIPPER Lab

Karen M. Kensek is on the faculty of the USC School of Architecture at the University of Southern California. She is a leading figure in architectural computing, focusing on analytical building information modeling and building science.

On January 29, 2020, it was announced that Kensek had been named a "Distinguished Professor of the Association of Collegiate Schools of Architecture," (ACSA) and would receive the award at the ACSA annual conference in March 2020.

== Background ==
Kensek completed an undergraduate degree in architecture at MIT, and a Master of Architecture at the University of California at Berkeley. She taught for several years at Berkeley prior to joining the faculty at the University of Southern California in 1991.

== Architectural Computing ==
She has written books on building information modeling, and has completed more than 100 research papers and 30 grants. In 1991, she founded the CLIPPER Lab with Douglas Noble at USC to support research and education in architectural computing. Together, they also conducted early architecture design studio experiments including a "supercomputing studio" in 1988 and one of the first fully "paperless studios" in 1993. She served as president of the Association for Computer Aided Design in Architecture in 1995. She has collaborated with noted architects and educators, including Pierre Koenig, Douglas E. Noble, Marc Eugene Schiler, and Ralph Lewis Knowles.

== Facade Tectonics ==
She co-founded the Facade Tectonics Institute in 2007, together with Douglas Noble and Mic Patterson, as a university-based research and education organization. The Facade Tectonics Institute has hosted conferences and published research papers focused on building facade technology.

== NotLY: Licensing in Architecture ==
Together, Noble and Kensek have received several awards for their innovative "NotLY: Not Licensed Yet" support system for individuals preparing for the Architect Registration Examination.

== Awards ==
- Design Intelligence 30 Most Admired Educators for 2015.
- ACSA Creative Achievement Award, 2014.
- AIA California Council (AIACC) Academy for Emerging Professionals (AEP) Educator Award, 2014.
- The NCARB Prize for Creative Integration of Practice and Education in the Academy, 2007.
- 2019 PCI Foundation Community Engagement Award.
- 2020 Distinguished Professor of the Association of Collegiate Schools of Architecture.

== Books by Kensek ==
- Kensek, K. (2014). Building Information Modeling. Routledge
- Kensek, K., & Noble, D. (2014). Building Information Modeling: BIM in Current and Future Practice. John Wiley & Sons.
- Kensek, K. (2015). Manuel BIM: Théorie et Applications. Éditions Eyrolles
