= Behnaz Farahi =

Iranian-born American architect and designer

- بهناز فرهی
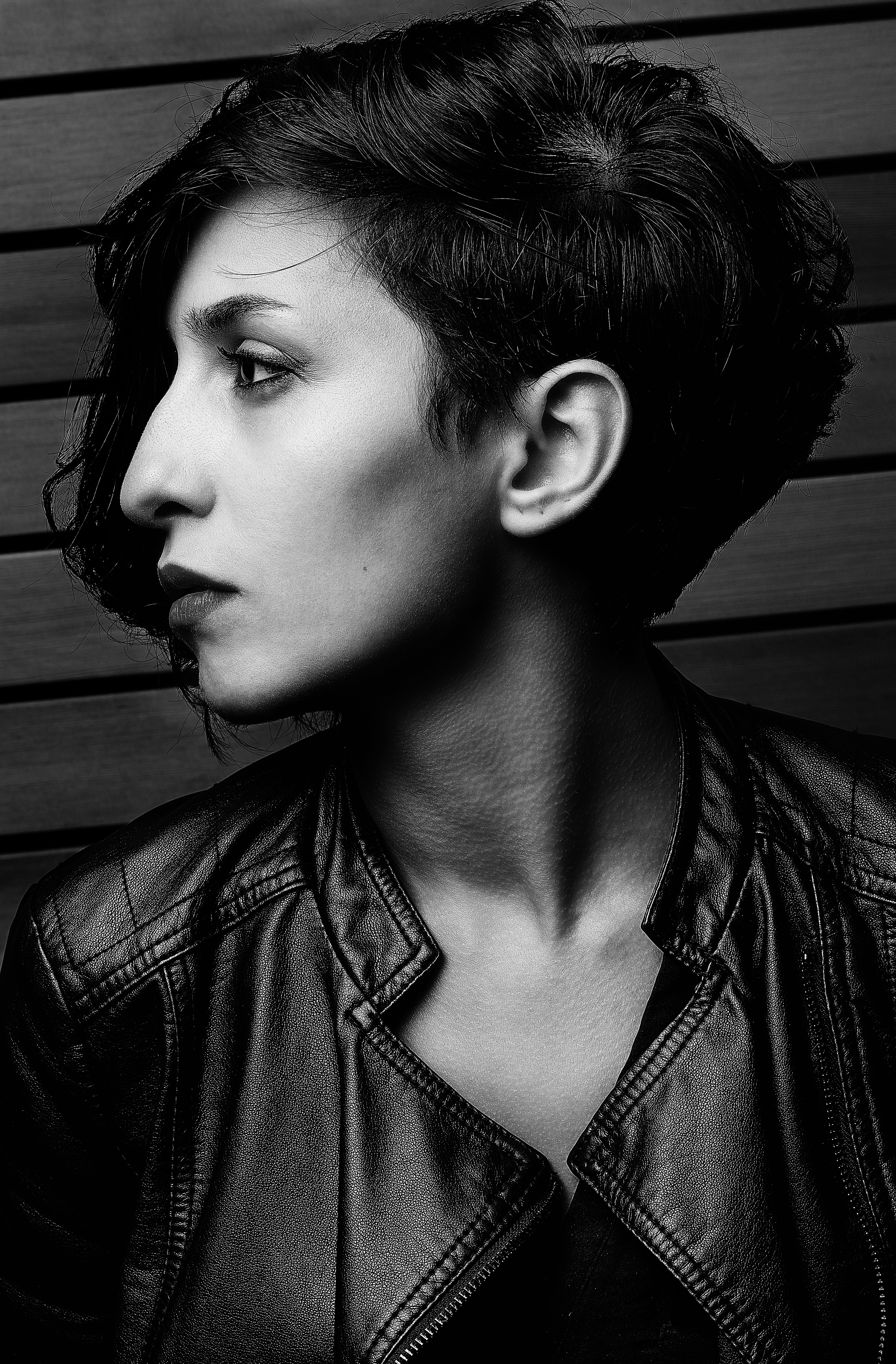
- Behnaz Farahi (2014) by Rudolf Bekker
- Born: Tehran, Iran
- Education: Shahid Beheshti University, Islamic Azad University, USC School of Cinematic Arts
- Occupations: Architect, designer, educator
- Website: behnazfarahi.com

Behnaz Farahi (Persian: بهناز فرهی) is an Iranian-born American interdisciplinary designer and educator whose work melds architecture, fashion, interaction design, computational design, wearable technology and the human body. Currently, she is an assistant professor at the MIT Media Lab. Her designs often explore the possibilities of human interaction with the environment and how technology can facilitate this interplay. Her work engages with the human body's relationship to its surroundings and how wearable technology can respond to, or be influenced by stimuli such as human emotions or environmental factors. Leveraging technology and art, Farahi's works are commentaries on power dynamics, society, and identity, frequently drawing inspiration from her cultural background and Western theories and practices, underpinned by theoretical concepts including socio-political feminist theory and anthropology.

== Early life and education ==
Behnaz Farahi was born and grew up in Tehran. As a child she started drawing and constructing mechanical devices. After finishing her studies of architecture at the Shahid Beheshti University and Azad University in Iran she moved to Los Angeles where she earned her second Master's degree at the USC School of Architecture. She holds a PhD in interdisciplinary media arts and practice from USC School of Cinematic Arts and taught as an assistant professor of design at California State University, Long Beach.Currently, she is an assistant professor at the MIT Media Lab.

== Career ==
Farahi has collaborated with Behrokh Khoshnevis on two NASA Innovative Advanced Concepts (NIAC) grants to develop a robotic fabrication technology to 3D print structures on the Moon and Mars.

She was an artist in Residence at Autodesk Pier 9, where she developed 3D printed design works, including "Caress of the Gaze".

== Major works ==
"Caress of the Gaze" In 2015 Farahi developed a 3D printed animatronic cape titled "Caress of the Gaze" which reacts to the looks of others by opening and closing those parts of the garment which are being gazed at. The cape features 3D printed quills and a concealed eye-tracking camera that allows the outfit to physically react to onlookers' stares. The garment's design has a semi-flexible mesh integrated with "muscle wire" that moves based on the gaze captured by the camera, which can also detect gender and possibly age. Farahi describes the piece as both a statement against unwanted attention and a wearable interaction tool.

"Can The Subaltern Speak", 2020, is an artwork featuring two masks enhanced with artificial intelligence, engage in a secret dialogue by blinking their eyelashes rapidly, transmitting messages via AI-generated Morse code. Drawing inspiration from Iranian historical masks worn by women in marginalized communities, the artwork serves as a symbolic shield against colonial oppression. The secretive communication aims to offer women an encrypted mode of interaction, subtly undermining patriarchal authority. The visual aesthetics of the piece are further enhanced with hypnotic music, coupling Farahi's computational design techniques with choreography and typography.

“Returning the Gaze” In 2022, Behnaz Farahi created a cyber-physical robotic installation supported by Universal Robots for fashion brand ANNAKIKI Milan Fashion Week on the themes of surveillance, being watched, and to challenge the male gaze in the fashion industry. The installation consisted of a wearable helmet type piece on a performance model with four screens displaying the model’s eyes. The suit uses two cameras to capture the wearer's eyes, which are then magnified onto screens held by four robotic arms, allowing the model to powerfully stare back at onlookers. Farahi's design is inspired by film theorist Laura Mulvey’s essay on the male gaze and its influence on culture and design. Farahi is also exploring what she calls "surveillance feminism," leveraging cameras and surveillance tools as instruments of female empowerment. It was exhibited in Milan Fashion week and at Siggraph.

== Awards ==
- 2022 Honorable mention, Fast Company’s Innovation by Design, New York, USA
- 2021 Winner, Cooper Hewitt Smithsonian Design Museum Digital Design Award, New York, USA
- 2016 Winner, World Technology Award in Design, WTN, Los Angeles, USA
- 2016 Winner, Innovation By Design Linda Tischler Award, Fast Company, New York, USA
- 2016 Finalist for Responsive Design, Interactive Innovation Award, SXSW 2016, Austin, USA
- 2013 Winner, Kinetic Art Organization, Boynton Beach, USA
- 2010 2nd Place, Mirmiran Competition, Tehran, Iran

== Exhibitions ==
Farahi has exhibited at Siggraph, USA, Milan Fashion Week, ITALY, Istanbul Archeology Museum, TURKEY MIT Center for Art, Science & Technology, USA, Ars Electronica, AUSTRIA, Museum of Science and Industry Chicago, USA, La piscine museum, FRANCE, and A+D Architecture and Design Museum LOS, USA.
