= Alvin Huang =

Chinese-American architect

Alvin Huang is a Chinese-American architect, educator, and designer based in Los Angeles, California. He is the founder of Synthesis Design + Architecture and an associate professor at the USC School of Architecture. In 2020, he was appointed the Director of Graduate & Post-professional Architecture at the USC School of Architecture.

== Biography ==
Huang received his Bachelor of Architecture from the University of Southern California in 1998 and his Master of Architecture from the Architectural Association School of Architecture in 2004.

Prior to establishing Synthesis Design + Architecture in Los Angeles, California, he worked for AECOM in the U.S. and further on for the architectural practices of Zaha Hadid Architects, AL A and Future Systems in London, UK.

== Awards ==
He has received numerous honors and awards including the 2016 AEP Young Architects Award by the American Institute of Architects California Council, 2015 R+D Award by Architect Magazine, and 2014 ACSA New Faculty Teaching Award by the Association of Collegiate Schools of Architecture.

== Work ==
Notable projects include Data Moire for IBM Watson (2016), Durotaxis Chair for Stratasys (2014), Pure Tension Pavilion for Volvo Cars (2014), the Groove at CentralWorld in Bangkok (2013), and the DRL10 Pavilion in London (2008). During the COVID-19 Pandemic of 2020, he spearheaded a grassroots effort known as Operation PPE, mobilizing over 300 architects, engineers, students and other volunteers throughout Southern California to 3D print personal protective equipment for medical professionals on the front lines.
