= Victor A. Regnier =

American architect and academic (born 1947)

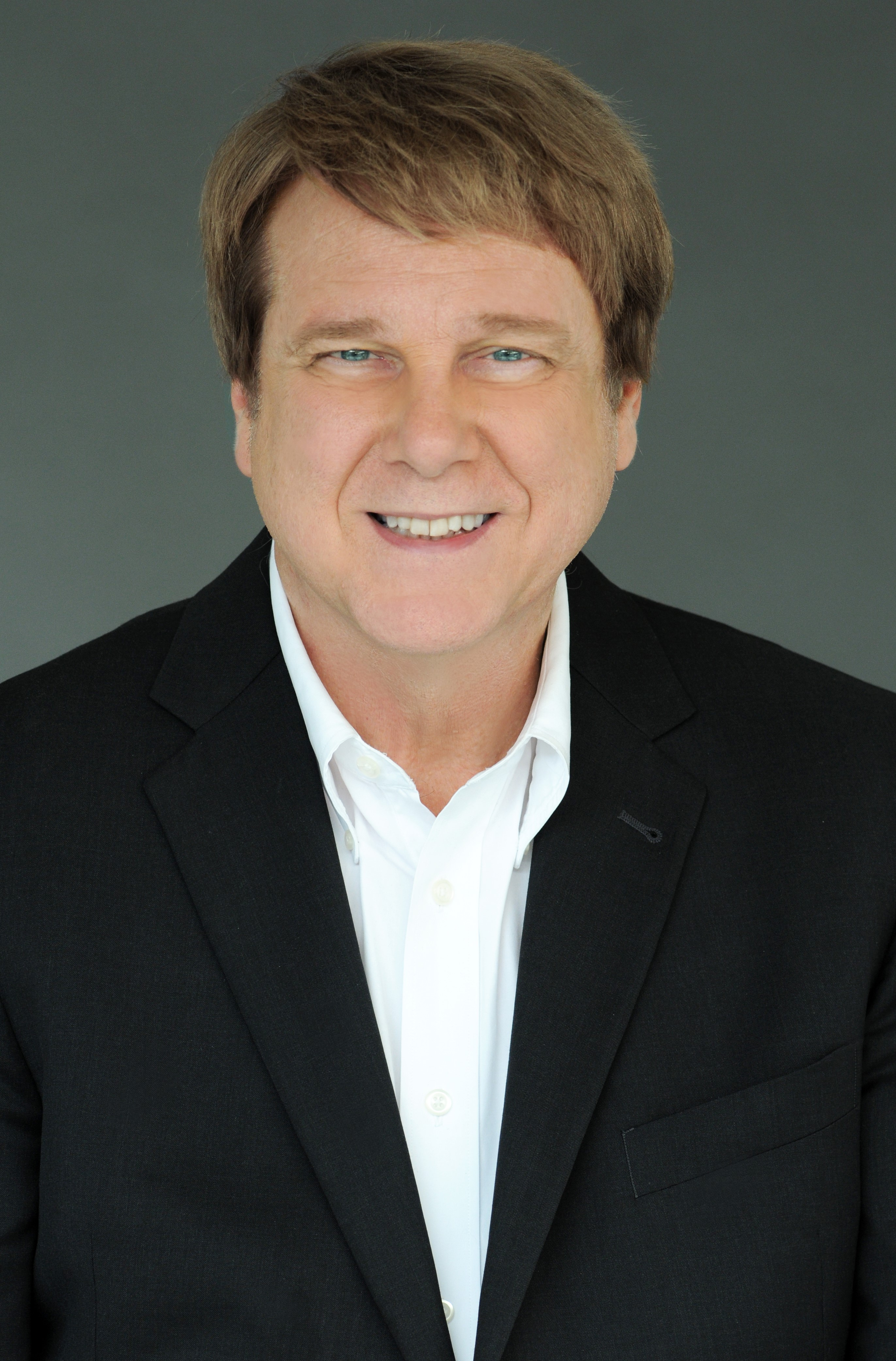
- Known for: Architecture, Assisted Living, Design for the Elderly
- Title: Professor, Architect and Planning/Design Consultant

Academic work
- Discipline: Architecture, Gerontology
- Institutions: University of Southern California (1973–1980, 1983–present); University of Illinois, Urbana-Champaign (1980–1982)

Victor A. Regnier FAIA (born 1947) is an American architect, professor, and researcher. His research and publications have explored the creation and evaluation of residential settings for the physically and cognitively frail with special attention to northern European precedents.

== Early life ==
Victor Regnier was born in 1947 in suburban Johnson County near Kansas City. His father was a builder and developer and his mother was a librarian. He is married to Judith Gonda Ph.D., a writer, and has two daughters Jennifer and Heather.

In 1973, he received his Master of Architecture from the University of Southern California (USC) under a fellowship program at the Ethel Percy Andrus Gerontology Center where his research centered on the role of supportive housing in achieving independence and life satisfaction for older people. Prior to that, he had received undergraduate degrees in Architecture and Architectural Engineering at Kansas State University.

He began his practice in Santa Monica, CA, as the vice president of Gerontological Planning Associates but soon joined USC's Andrus Center as a researcher and preceptor. Eventually, he became the chief of the Environmental Studies Laboratory at the Andrus Center.

== Academic career ==
In 1979, he accepted a tenured joint appointment at the University of Illinois, Urbana-Champaign teaching design in the graduate architecture program and doing research in a think tank called the Program of Housing Research and Development. At Illinois, he taught graduate seminars and design studios, while focusing his research on design decision making.

In 1983, he joined the faculty of the USC School of Architecture as a tenured associate professor with a joint appointment at the Andrus Gerontology Center. In 1992, he was appointed Dean of the School of Architecture (1992–1995) and promoted to full professor. Subsequently, he served as the Vice Dean for External Affairs (2011–2012) and the Associate Dean for Research (2016–2017).

In addition to issues associated with aging, he teaches studios and seminars at USC Architecture in Health Care Design.

== Design principles and priorities ==
Identifying the innovative qualities of northern European housing and care settings for the frail has been the centerpiece of his research over the last 30 years.

It is often said that the value and meaning of a civilization can be determined from the record it leaves in the form of architecture and that the true measure of the compassion and civility of a society lies in how well it treats its frail older people.

— Victor Regnier FAIA, ACSA Distinguished Professor

His work intertwining theory and practice focuses primarily on:

- Maximizing housing choice, especially residential alternatives to traditional long-term care,
- Models of housing, services, and community design that accommodate aging in place,
- Care management and service provision strategies that stimulate autonomy, independence, and control,
- Housing models that encourage physical exercise and prioritize safety and social connectivity and
- Approaches to environmental design that support the goals of health, longevity, and happiness.

== Academic and professional achievements ==
His work is relevant because it intertwines theory with practice. He is a Fellow of the American Institute of Architects(FAIA) as well as the Gerontological Society of America(FGSA), a singular distinction. In 2008, the Association of Collegiate Schools of Architecture (ACSA) made him an ACSA Distinguished Professor to recognize his teaching and research.

Regnier has published 13 books/monographs as well as over 65 articles and book chapters. He has directed over 25 research projects. From 1993 to 2010, Regnier taught in the summer Executive Education Program in the Harvard Graduate School of Design.

== Books and research monographs ==
Books:

- Regnier, V. Assisted Living for the Elderly: Design Innovations from the United States and Europe, New York Van Nostrand Reinhold, 1994, ISBN 0-442-00702-7, Reprinted by Wiley Publishing, 1997.0-442
- Regnier, V., J. Hamilton and S. Yatabe, Assisted Living for the Aged and Frail: Innovations in Design, Management and Financing, New York: Columbia University Press, 1995, ISBN 0-231-08276-2
- Regnier, V. Design for Assisted Living: Guidelines for Housing the Physically and Mentally Frail, New York: John Wiley and Sons, 2002, ISBN 0-471-35182-2
- Regnier, V. Housing Design for an Increasingly Older Population: Redefining Assisted Living for the Mentally and Physically Frail, Hoboken N.J.: John Wiley and Sons, 2018, ISBN 978-1119-180074

Edited books:

- Regnier, V. (ed) Planning for the Elderly: Alternative Community Analysis Techniques, Los Angeles: University of Southern California Press, 1979, ISBN 0-88474-093-5
- Regnier, V. and J. Pynoos, (eds.) Housing the Aged: Design Directives and Policy Considerations, New York: Elsevier, 1987, ISBN 0-444-01012-2
- Robinson, P., Livingston, J., and Birren, J. (Eds.); Regnier, V., Small, S., and Sterns, H. (Assoc. Eds.) Aging and Technological Advances. New York: Plenum Press, 1984, ISBN 978-1-4613-2401-0

Monographs:

- Regnier, V., J. Hamilton, and S. Yatabe, Best Practices in Assisted Living: Innovations in Design, Management and Financing, National Eldercare Institute on Housing and Supportive Services, University of Southern California, Los Angeles, CA, ISBN 1-881010-00-7
- Regnier, V. USC Emeriti Center: A Vision for the Future, University of Southern California, School of Architecture, Los Angeles, 2010, ISBN 978-0-615-37812-1
- Regnier, V. USC Apartment for Life: Emeriti Center, Civic Engagement Center, University of Southern California, School of Architecture, Los Angeles, 2013, ISBN 978-0-578-12743-9
- Regnier, V. MPTF Apartment for Life: Motion Picture and Television Fund Campus, University of Southern California, School of Architecture, Los Angeles, 2014, ISBN 978-0-692-24652-8

Translations:

- Regnier, V. Senior Living 101, New York: John Wiley and Sons and Kajima Publishing, 2007, (Japanese Translation of Design for Assisted Living), ISBN 978-4-306-04492-0
- Regnier, V. Housing Design for an Increasingly Older Population: Redefining Assisted Living for the Mentally and Physically Frail (Mandarin Translation), Beijing: China Architecture and Building Press, 2019, ISBN 978-7-112-23903-0

== Honors and awards ==
- ACSA Distinguished Professorship, 2008 in perpetuity
- Fellow of the American Institute of Architects designation, 1994
- Fellow of the Gerontological Society of America designation, 1982
- USC Architectural Guild Distinguished Alumnus Award, 2007
- Alumni Fellow Award, Kansas State University, 2001
- Entrepreneur Hall of Fame designee, Bloch Management School, UMKC, 2014

Research and academic awards

- Fulbright Scholarship Award, Sweden, Denmark, Norway, 1991-1992 (Western Regional Research Award)
- Fulbright Scholarship Award, Lisbon, Portugal, 2014-2015 (Teaching and Research)
- Progressive Architecture Award for Architectural Research, 1994
- Progressive Architecture Citation for Research, 1988
- Merit Award in Research, American Society for Landscape Architects, 1986
- M. Powell Lawton Polisher Award, Gerontological Society of America, 1999
- Phi Kappa Phi Book Publication Award (with Jon Pynoos) USC,1988
- Thord Gray Memorial Scholarship, The America-Scandinavian Foundation, 1991
- Center Fellow, UCLA/USC Long Term Care Center, Los Angeles, 1983-1984
- USC University Scholar, 1988
- Phi Kappa Phi Honorary Society Designation, USC, 1998

== Service and philanthropy ==
Regnier has been a member of numerous boards and organizations including the Gamble House Conservancy; the USC Architectural Guild; USC Associates; USC Leonard Davis Dean's Circle; the Community Design Center of Los Angeles (past president); Syracuse University School of Information Science Board of Visitors; Kansas University (KU) Chancellor's Club (Mt. Oread Society); Kansas State University, President's Club (George T Fairchild Society) and the Foundation to Assist California Teachers (FACT).

Regnier has also served on the editorial or advisory board of 9 journals or professional magazines.

Through his own personal and family foundations he has funded endowed scholarships for students at USC Architecture, the USC Gerontology Center, the University of Arizona, Kansas State University, Syracuse University, the University of Illinois (Champaign-Urbana), and Johnson County Community College.

His charitable giving through his family foundation, (including his brother Robert and sister Catherine) over the last 20 years has included the following buildings: Regnier Hall on the KSU campus, Regnier Hall on the KU/KC Campus, Regnier Center on the Johnson County Community College campus, and the Regnier Family Wonderscope Children's Museum. In addition, they have endowed the Regnier Institute for Entrepreneurship and Innovation at the Bloch Business School at UMKC, and the Victor L. Regnier Architecture and Victor L. Regnier Distinguished Visiting Chair (2 chairs) at Kansas State University in the College of Architecture, Planning, and Design. Additional endowed programs focus on the priority topics of science, education, and children.
