= Steven Ehrlich =

American architect

- Born: June 12, 1946 (age 80); New York City, U.S.
- Education: Rensselaer Polytechnic Institute
- Occupation: Architect
- Awards: Maybeck Award; AIA Los Angeles Gold Medal
- Practice: Ehrlich Yanai Rhee Chaney Architects
- Buildings: Ahmadu Bello University Theatre, John M. Roll United States Courthouse, McElroy Residence, UC Irvine Contemporary Arts Center, Walter Cronkite School of Journalism and Mass Communication, ASU School of Earth & Space Exploration, 700 Palms Residence
- Website: eyrc.com

Steven Ehrlich, FAIA, RIBA (born June 12, 1946) is an American architect based in Culver City, California. He is the founding partner of the practice Ehrlich Yanai Rhee Chaney Architects, formerly known as Ehrlich Architects.

== Life and career ==
Ehrlich was born in New York City in 1946 and grew up in the Radburn section of Fair Lawn, New Jersey. He graduated from Rensselaer Polytechnic Institute in 1969. Upon graduating, Ehrlich spent six years working in Africa, serving for two years in the Peace Corps as its first architect in Marrakesh, Morocco. Ehrlich traveled across the Sahara and taught architecture at Ahmadu Bello University in Nigeria. He admired the simplicity and effectiveness of the vernacular architecture that he encountered in Africa. Ehrlich moved to Venice, California in 1979 and established a small residential studio. The influence from African architecture and the diverse environment of Los Angeles led to a trademarked design philosophy that Ehrlich coined "multicultural modernism," which advocates a sensitivity to the local culture in the process of design. Ehrlich's studio has developed into an internationally renowned firm, now called Ehrlich Yanai Rhee Chaney Architects, which engages in residential, civic, commercial, and educational work. His forty-people firm was awarded the 2015 AIA National Architecture Firm Award and the 2003 AIA California Council Firm Award.

== Academics ==
Ehrlich has taught at Ahmadu Bello University, Montana State University, SCI-Arc, and UCLA. He is currently a visiting professor at the USC School of Architecture. He has been a visiting design critic at Harvard University, Yale University, and Woodbury University.

== Major projects ==
=== Completed ===
- Ahmadu Bello University Theater, Zaria, Nigeria, 1976
- 700 Palms Residence, Venice, CA, 2004
- Walter Cronkite School of Journalism and Mass Communication, Phoenix, AZ, 2008
- UC Irvine Contemporary Arts Center, Irvine, CA, 2010
- ASU School of Earth and Space Exploration, Tempe, AZ, 2012
- John M. Roll United States Courthouse, Yuma, AZ, 2013
- McElroy Residence, Long Beach, CA, 2013
- Kalfus Guest House, 2456 Astral Drive, Hollywood Hills, Los Angeles, CA

=== In progress ===
- FNC Parliament Complex, Abu Dhabi, UAE.

== Awards and honors ==
- Maybeck Award, AIA California Council / 2011
- Gold Medal, AIA Los Angeles / 2015
