= Carapace Pavilion =

Shade Pavilion in Joshua Tree National Park

Coordinates: 34°00′28″N 116°07′04″W

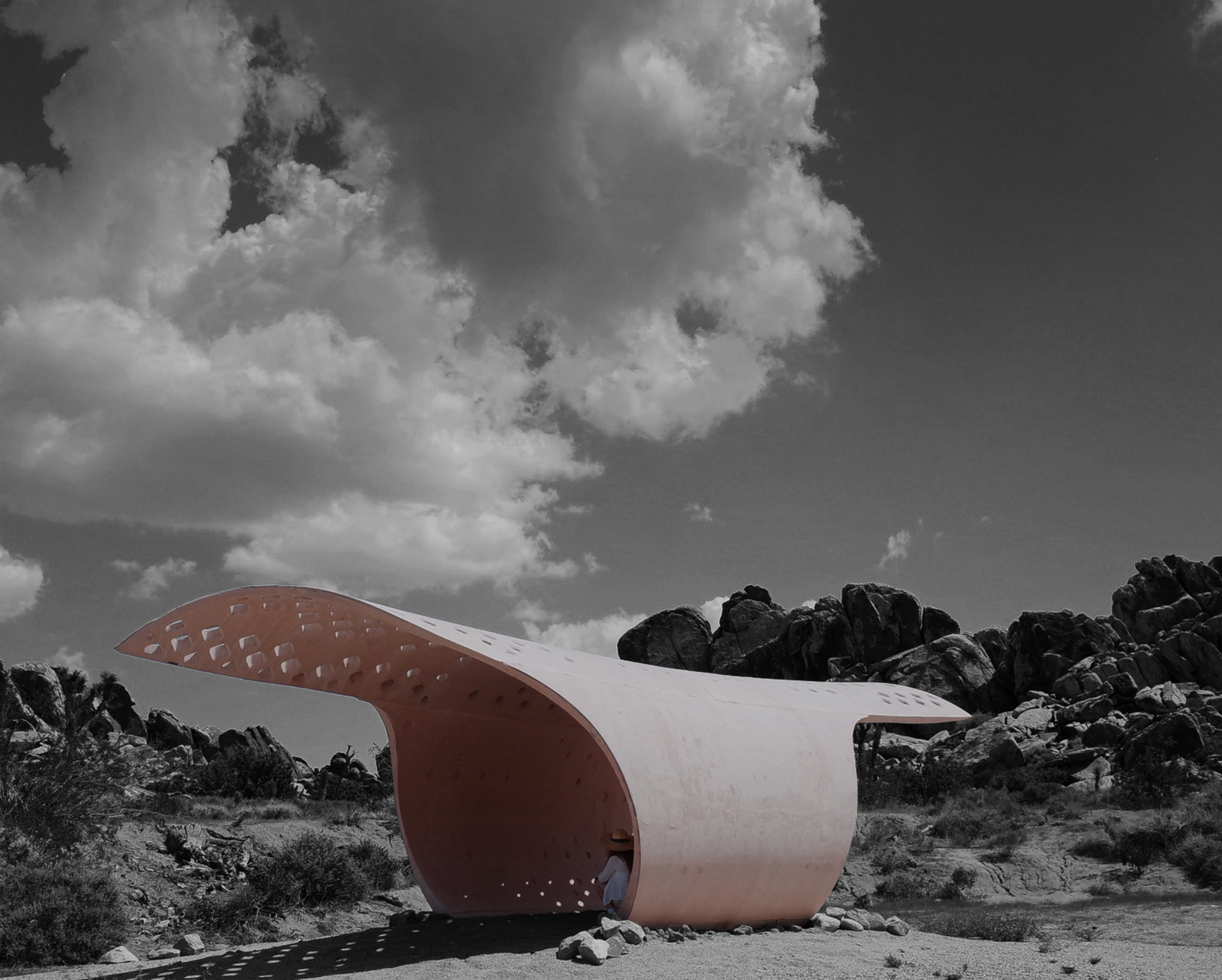
The Carapace Pavilion installed in Joshua Tree National Park

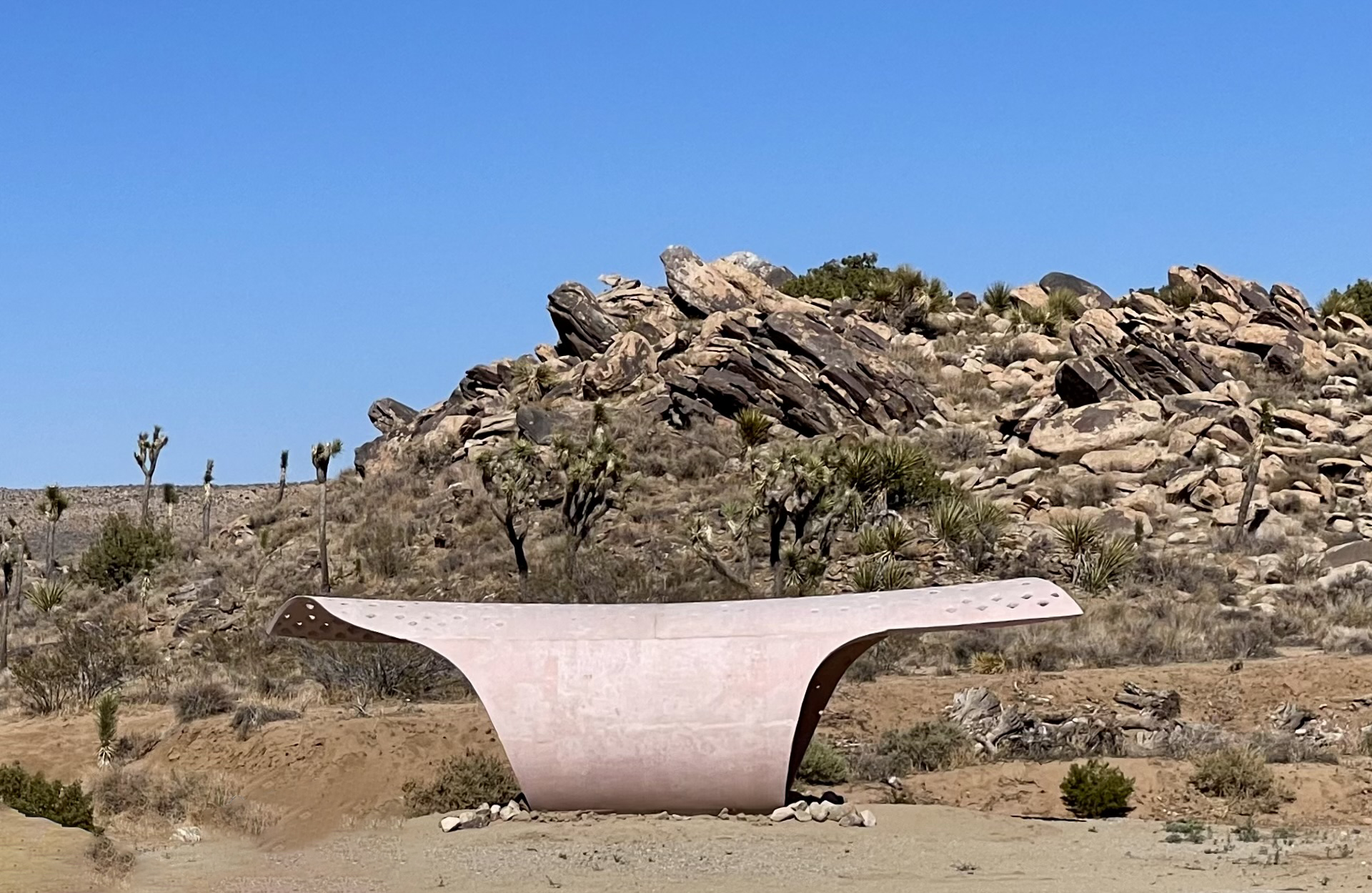
The Carapace Pavilion is a small building in Joshua Tree National Park

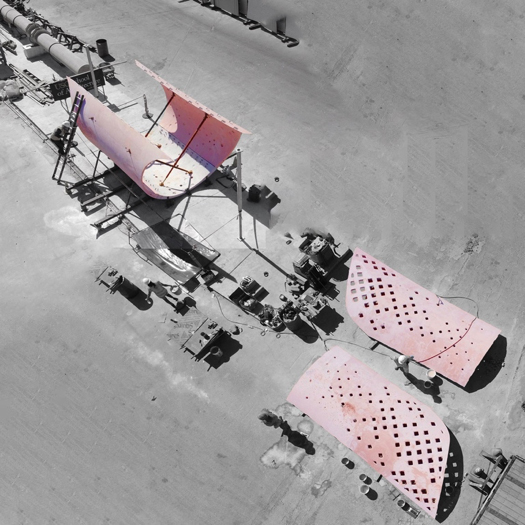
Drone view of the Carapace Pavilion under construction at Clark Pacific Precast

The Carapace Pavilion is a shade pavilion structure in Joshua Tree National Park. It was designed, fabricated, and installed by students and faculty of the USC School of Architecture at the University of Southern California. The project is noted for its complex geometry that was enabled through parametric computer design methods. It is fabricated from Ultra-high performance concrete (UHPC). The Carapace Pavilion is the result of a partnership between the US National Park Service, the USC School of Architecture, Clark Pacific Precast, and the PCI Foundation. It was designed and fabricated over a three-year period, and installed in Joshua Tree National Park on June 20, 2022.

== Awards ==
- 2021 American Institute of Architects, Los Angeles Chapter 2021 Design Citation Award
- 2022 PCI Design Award Building Award: Best Custom Solutions
- 2022 PCI Design Award All-Precast Concrete Solution Honorable Mention
- 2023 Society Of American Registered Architects (SARA) Student National Design Award Excellence in Design Award
- 2023 SARA California Design Award Winner Design Excellence Award
