= Esther McCoy =

American novelist and architectural historian (1904–1989)

Esther McCoy (November 18, 1904 – December 30, 1989) was an American author and architectural historian who was instrumental in bringing the modern architecture of California to the attention of the world.

== Early life and education ==
Born in Horatio, Arkansas, Esther McCoy was raised in Kansas. She attended the Central College for Women, a preparatory school in Lexington, Missouri, before a college career that took her from Baker University to the University of Arkansas, then to Washington University in St. Louis, and finally the University of Michigan. She left the University of Michigan in 1925, and by 1926 was living in New York City and embarking on a writing career.

== California and later life ==
In 1932 McCoy was diagnosed with pneumonia and headed West for Los Angeles to recover. She purchased a bungalow in the Ocean Park section of Santa Monica in the late 1930s, where she lived for the remainder of her life, although she traveled widely. During World War II, McCoy worked as a draftsman for R.M. Schindler after being discouraged from applying to USC's architecture school due to her age and sex. After a long and varied writing and teaching career, she died in December 1989.

== Fiction and journalism ==
In 1929, McCoy began to publish fiction in magazines such as The New Yorker and Harper's Bazaar, as well as in university quarterlies. Her short story "The Cape" was featured in The Best American Short Stories of 1950. In 1924, McCoy met author Theodore Dreiser, and for more than a decade she researched him. She wrote novels, short stories, and screenplays during her years in New York and after moving to Los Angeles. She continued to write fiction into the 1960s, though her first significant article on architecture had been published in 1945. McCoy and a friend, Allen Read, co-authored a series of detective novels under the pseudonym "Allan McRoyd."

McCoy was also a journalist and active member of the Left who wrote for Direction, Upton Sinclair's EPIC [End Poverty in California] News, and the United Progressive News.

== Architectural writing ==
From 1950 until she died in 1989, McCoy was a frequent contributor to John Entenza's Los Angeles-based magazine Arts & Architecture, to Architectural Forum, Architectural Record, and Progressive Architecture, as well as to European magazines such as L'Architectura and Lotus. She also wrote pieces on architecture for the Los Angeles Times and the Los Angeles Herald-Examiner.

Her first major book, published in 1960, was Five California Architects, the first work to bring to the attention of a wide audience the works of pioneer California modernists Charles and Henry Greene, Irving Gill, Bernard Maybeck, and the Los Angeles-based Austrian emigre Rudolf Schindler. This book was followed by others devoted to the Case Study Houses sponsored by Arts & Architecture, Schindler's fellow emigre Richard Neutra, and architects Craig Ellwood, Calvin C. Straub, among others.

During this era, she also wrote catalogs for gallery and museum exhibitions devoted to modern California architecture and contributed essays to numerous other exhibition catalogs. She lectured at the University of Southern California and at UCLA and transcribed and cataloged Richard Neutra's papers in the UCLA archives.

In addition to her work in California, McCoy wrote extensively on Italian architecture, making several extended trips there during the 1950s and 1960s, and she was curator of an exhibition entitled Ten Italian Architects which was mounted by the Los Angeles County Museum of Art. In recognition of her research and writing on Italian architecture, the Italian government in 1960 awarded her the Star of the Order of Solidarity.

McCoy's last work was an essay for the catalog of an exhibition on the Case Study Houses which was mounted by the Los Angeles Museum of Contemporary Art. She died in Santa Monica in December 1989, one month before the exhibition opened.

Her extensive collection of papers, slides, and photographs, are held by the Archives of American Art of the Smithsonian Institution.

In March 2012, East of Borneo Books published Piecing Together Los Angeles: An Esther McCoy Reader, the first collection of McCoy's writings, edited and with an essay by writer Susan Morgan.

== Books ==
- 1960: Five California Architects, (New York: Reinhold).
- 1960: Richard Neutra, (New York: G. Braziller).
- 1962: Modern California Houses: Case Study Houses (New York: Reinhold)
  - reprinted as Case Study Houses, (Los Angeles: Hennessey and Ingalls), 1978.
- 1968: Craig Ellwood (New York: Walker & Company).
  - reprinted (Los Angeles: Hennessey and Ingalls), 1998.
- 1979: Vienna to Los Angeles: Two Journeys (Santa Monica, Calif.: Arts & Architecture Press).
- 1984: The Second Generation (Salt Lake City: Peregrine Smith Books).
- 2012: Piecing Together Los Angeles: An Esther McCoy Reader (Ed. Susan Morgan. Los Angeles: East of Borneo Books).

== Sources ==
- "Esther McCoy Is Dead; Architecture Critic, 85", The New York Times, December 31, 1989
- "An Esther McCoy Revival Tells Story of L.A.'s Modern Architecture", Los Angeles Times, December 18, 2011
- Esther McCoy Collection at the Archives of American Art
- Piecing Together Los Angeles: An Esther McCoy Reader
- "Esther McCoy, Mother Modern"
- One Woman Crusade
- "Reading L.A.: Esther McCoy"
