= Synthesis Design + Architecture =

Synthesis Design + Architecture (also known as SDA), is an architecture and design firm based in Los Angeles, California led by Alvin Huang.

== Awards ==
The firm was honored with the Presidential Emerging Practice of the Year Award by the American Institute of Architects Los Angeles Chapter in 2016. They also received the R+D Award from Architect Magazine in 2015, and was featured as a Next Progressive by Architect Magazine in 2014.
