= Marcus Whiffen =

American historian (1916–2002)

Whiffen as he appeared on the back of his 1958 The Public Buildings of Williamsburg

Marcus Whiffen (4 March 1916 - February 2002) was an English journalist, historian, author and photographer specialising in British and American architecture. He was also a Professor Emeritus in the School of Architecture at Arizona State University.

== Life and career ==
Marcus Whiffen was born in Ross-on-Wye, Herefordshire on 4 March 1916, the son of Thomas Joseph Whiffen and Jessie Anne Hardy.

He graduated from Cambridge University with a bachelor of Arts in 1937, and completed his Masters in 1946.

Following his graduation, he joined The Architect and Building News. After the war, in 1946, he joined the Architectural Review (London) as an assistant editor.

Whiffen moved to the United States in 1952, where he held lecturer positions at Massachusetts Institute of Technology and then at the University of Texas. In 1954, he joined Colonial Williamsburg as an architectural historian. He moved to Arizona State University in 1960 where he held various positions–the final as Professor Emeritus. He corresponded extensively with several other leading architectural historians including Sir Nikolaus Pevsner, Henry-Russell Hitchcock and Sir John Summerson, as well as architects Walter Gropius, Paul Schweikher, and Bart Prince.

Whiffen served as Director of the Society of Architectural Historians (1969-1971, 1975-1978) and Director of the Association of Collegiate Schools of Architecture (1963-1968). His awards included the Society of Architectural Historians Annual Book Award for The Public Buildings of Williamsburg (1958) and the Arizona State University Alumni Association Faculty Achievement Award (1979).

Whiffen lived in a house in the Arcadia district of Phoenix, Arizona and designed for him in 1963 by architect (and Arizona State University colleague) Calvin C. Straub. He died, aged 85, in Phoenix in February 2002.

Photographs by Marcus Whiffen are held at the Conway Library in the Courtauld, London, and are being digitised.

== Select bibliography ==
- Stuart and Georgian churches: the Architecture of the Church of England outside London 1603-1837. Marcus Whiffen. B. T. Batsford, 1948. ISBN 1199549886
- Thomas Archer: Architect of the English Baroque. Marcus Whiffen, Art & Technics, 1950. ASIN B0000CHSQV
- The Architecture of Sir Charles Barry in Manchester and Neighbourhood. Marcus Whiffen. Manchester, 1950.
- An Introduction to Elizabethan and Jacobean Architecture. Marcus Whiffen. Art & Technics, 1952. ASIN B0000CI8FD
- The Public Buildings of Williamsburg - colonial capital of Virginia - an architectural history. Marcus Whiffen. Williamsburg, Va. Colonial Williamsburg, 1958. ASIN B0007DPFK0
- American Architecture, 1607-1976. Marcus Whiffen. Cambridge: MIT Pr. 1981. ISBN 9780262231053
- The Eighteenth-century houses of Williamsburg - a study of architecture and building in the colonial capital of Virginia. Marcus Whiffen. Williamsburg, Va. Colonial Williamsburg Foundation, 1983. ASIN B000GR8V5I
- Pueblo deco: The art deco architecture of the Southwest. Marcus Whiffen and Carla Breeze. Albuquerque. University of New Mexico Press, c1984. ISBN 0826306764
- American architecture since 1780: a guide to the styles. Marcus Whiffen. Cambridge, Mass. London: MIT, 1992. ISBN 9780262730570
