= Wes Jones =

American architect

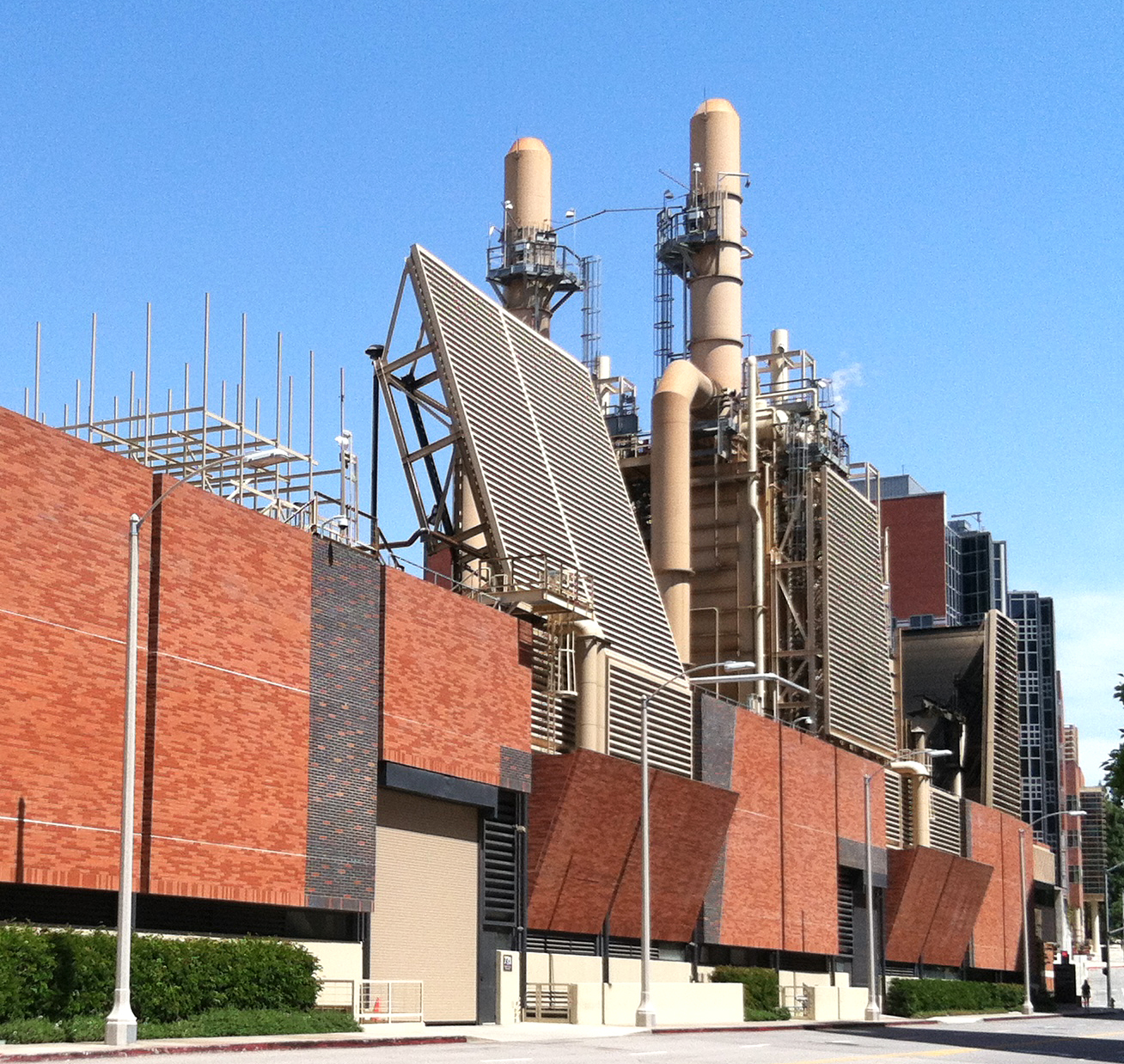
UCLA Cogen Chiller Facility

Wesley Jones (born January 27, 1958, in Santa Monica, California) is an American architect, educator and author. Founding partner of Holt Hinshaw Pfau Jones, in 1987 and then Jones, Partners: Architecture in 1993, Jones is a leading architectural voice of his generation, advocating for a continuing appreciation of the physical side of technology within a world increasingly enamored of the virtual. For most of his career this has taken the form of an overt fascination with mechanical expression, both static and moving, and his designs have been celebrated for their "engaging operability” and humor. In his early writings he focused on making the case for the appropriateness of mechanical form in architecture, but his later essays have also taken on more fundamental disciplinary questions, particularly with respect to the growing hegemony of digital design.

== Biography ==
Jones attended the United States Military Academy at West Point from 1976 to 1978 where he achieved academic distinction, being named a “distinguished cadet” or “starman.” From West Point Jones transferred to the University of California at Berkeley, from which he graduated in 1980, receiving and AB “with Highest Honors,” and giving the student commencement address. This speech was a joint effort of Jones and several of his classmates. Together they had gathered samples of the graffiti for which the College of Environmental Design's Wurster Hall was famous at the time, and Jones read the sometimes scatological collection on this august occasion in a twenty-minute monologue. Jones next attended the Graduate School of Design at Harvard University. After producing a thesis that offered a critical homage to Le Corbusier’s Unite d’Habitation, Jones received a Master of Architecture with Distinction in 1984. In his final semester at the GSD Jones served as a teaching assistant for the first of Peter Eisenman’s three studios there, and he joined Eisenman’s office, Eisenman/Robertson after graduating.

Jones spent three years at Eisenman’s office, working on the Traveler’s Insurance Building in Long Island and the Wexner Center at OSU. While at Eisenman’s office, Jones won the “Rome Prize,” which took him to Rome for a year as a Fellow at the American Academy in Rome.

HHPJ

Upon returning to the United States from Rome, Jones moved to San Francisco where, with his partner Peter Pfau (like many young New York architects, they moonlighted from day jobs with their famous employers, doing competitions and the rare small remodels as "Pfau Jones" before Jones had gone to Rome) he joined Paul Holt and Marc Hinshaw in the new firm Holt Hinshaw Pfau Jones.

As the partner-in-charge of design at HHPJ, Jones was responsible for the design of the projects that established the firm's international reputation for technologically inspired work, including the Astronaut's Memorial at Kennedy Space Center in Florida, the Paramount Studios Film and Tape Archive, the San Jose Repertory Theater, and the Right Away Redi-Mix dispatch and batch facility. In addition, Jones authored several well known competition designs, including US Pavilion, Expo 92 for Seville, Spain, and the New Akropolis Museum, Athen, Greece (so notorious that the jurors voted to keep it out of the competition book of all the entries), and the Columbus Convention Center, in which Jones’ firm of youngsters competed against Eisenman's office and Michael Graves office. Eisenman won the competition. All told, the work of Jones during this period racked up 8 Progressive Architecture awards, as well as numerous publications and exhibitions.

J,P:A

In 1993 Jones started his own firm, Jones, Partners: Architecture, in San Francisco; in 1997 the entire firm moved down to El Segundo in Southern California. Important buildings completed by the new firm include the Zimmer Plaza stair, a structural tour de force at the University of Cincinnati, the Confluence Point Bridges and Interpretive Center in San Jose, and the UCLA Chiller Plant and Campus Facilities Offices, as well as a number of residences around Southern California. The office also completed a number of competitions, including the Grand Egyptian Museum, Queensland Gallery of Modern Art, and the Royal Danish Theater and installations, such as the “Shuffle” project, installed in the SCI-Arc gallery, in which several columns suspended from bridge cranes rearranged themselves throughout the course of the exhibit to demonstrate space-defining effects.

In 1995 Jones began a study of the use of ISO standard shipping containers in design, with his project for air-delivered mountain cabins for the high Sierras. This eventually led to the development of the PRO/con or PROgram CONtainer system, debuted at the Hammer Museum in 1999. This system overcomes the limited repertoire of spaces available in container-based design (CBD) by interpolating conventional construction in the spaces between widely separated containers, using the containers as structural supports, rather than merely enclosure. Jones received a patent for this PRO/dek system, which modifies high density movable storage systems to support programmed activities in a space-saving way.

Jones has taught at various schools of architecture in the United States, including Harvard, Columbia, Princeton, IIT, Ohio State, UCLA, Southern California Institute of Architecture (SCI-Arc) and UC Berkeley. Since 2015, Jones has been teaching at USC's School of Architecture, where he was named Architecture Discipline Head and Director of the Graduate Architecture program.

Work

Jones has designed a number of relevant buildings, but he is equally known for his ideas about technology and the discipline of architecture. The character of his work has been unusually consistent over the course of his career, maintaining throughout a general orientation to the forms and patterns of technology. Ranging from straightforward, or “classic” modernism to an exuberant form of technological exhibitionism that has been called “high tech,” but which Jones calls simply “mechanality,” the work can be considered, in his words, “machines for…” echoing the famous phrase of Le Corbusier that the house is a “machine for dwelling.”

The work has exhibited humor at times. Understandably, the more overt examples of this humor has been found more often in the theoretical projects than the built work, but the built work has taken some license in challenging conventions in a wry way, such as the “dance” of mechanical screens at the UCLA Chiller Plant or “fake” sky at the Paramount Studios Film and Tape Archive. Jones’ “souped up” Chaise, in the collection of the San Francisco Museum of Modern Art, “hot rods” Le Corbusier and Charlotte Perriand’s famous “chaise longue a relage continu.” Jones has introduced elements of cartooning into the published work of the office, and has penned a comic series for the publication ANY.

Important Buildings and projects designed by Jones include the Astronaut's Memorial (1991), UCLA Chiller Plant and Campus Facilities Offices (1994), San Jose Repertory Theater (1996), the NYTimes Capsule competition finalist (1999) and Sub-‘burb 2025 House of the Future, for Time Magazine (2000).

== Ideas ==
Jones has written extensively on a variety of topics not directly related to the particular buildings of the office. His interests have centered on either technology—its place or role in society, its relation to architecture—and the discipline of architecture, particularly as it has been affected by new advances in digital design technology. Most of the writings by Jones have been collected in the two monograph volumes that cover the work of J,P:A, Instrumental Form (1997) and El Segundo (2007). Jones continues to contribute to various publications related to architecture, such as Log and Harvard Design Magazine. During the 1990s Jones contributed a regular cartoon feature called “The Nelsons” to ANY magazine, a retrospective for which was recently held at the LA Forum, resulting in the publication of the collected series as Meet the Nelsons (2010). Jones used this medium to lambast the critical establishment of the time, for which ANY magazine was a leading platform.

SOUPING UP The term “souping up” appears often in his writings and lectures. The term originated in the hot rod culture of Southern California. Jones uses it to name a process of upgrading or enhancing an architectural type or program, using more advanced technology or more adventurous form. He relates this process to the way in which a jalopy is turned into a hot rod; in its early form he emphasizes its lower tech “American” roots, contrasting it with the “haute tech” way a Ferrari might be designed. [Instrumental Form, 109] In later writings he talks about it more from the standpoint of its inherent respect for the original object, in order to separate it from the critical practices of “deconstructivism,” which depend to some extent on a more violent treatment of their “hosts.” [El Segundo, 307] The “souping up” technique, which Jones also sees as offering a critique of the meaninglessness of the “form finding” operations of “diagram” architecture and the negativity of conventional critical architecture, has been used in many of the buildings that he has designed. Indeed, he has called the Astronaut's Memorial a souped up version of the Viet Nam Veterans Memorial (by Maya Lin 1982).

TECHNOLOGY AS MEANS TO ENGAGEMENT Jones often refers to the work of Martin Heidegger in his writings and lectures, but far from being critical of technology, as Heidegger is usually considered to be, Jones champions another reading, which grows from the philosopher's claim that “technology is a way of revealing.” Indeed, Jones often quotes Heidegger as saying that “technology teases nature into unhiddenness,” though this may be a misreading or confusion with the sentiments of Francis Bacon's “nature reveals itself under the vexations of art…” From this, though, Jones takes license to understand technology positively as a lens through which the world is viewed, and that as such the design of that lens might enhance engagement with that world. So rather than seeing technology as blocking direct experience of Being and nature, as Heidegger does, Jones sees technology as a means to more direct experience.

DISCIPLINE Jones has been vocal about the danger he thinks the new, very popular digital design technology may pose to the discipline in its heedless rush to newness and difference. He advocates instead a focus on “excellence,” quoting Mies van der Rohe's statement that he “would rather be good than interesting.” He points out that the standards that architecture has maintained over its history are best suited to judgments of excellence, rather than novelty, dismissing newness as merely a chronological state. Jones criticizes what he sees as a common logical mistake in confusing simple newness with progress. Progress, he says, implies improvement rather than mere difference, but judging improvement entails understanding goodness as well as difference. Architectural goodness is the territory of the discipline. Jones claims that the digital processes popular in the field by the late ‘aughts will lead to a value system more appropriate to the engineer, for whom goodness is something computed, or quantitatively measured, because the highest values are associated with efficiency and efficacy. In contrast, he says, architecture distinguishes itself as interested in everything other or beyond those: expression, the ineffable, the will.
