= Buff, Smith and Hensman =

American architectural firm

Buff, Smith and Hensman (formerly Buff, Straub and Hensman) is an architectural firm. The office has won more than 30 awards for house designs from the American Institute of Architects. The firm was known as Buff and Hensman when Cal Straub moved to Arizona and later Buff, Smith and Hensman when Dennis Smith bought the practice after Don Hensman's retirement.

== Partners ==
The partnership, originally Buff, Straub, and Hensman, consisted of Conrad Buff III, Calvin Straub, and Donald (Don) Hensman, all of whom were American Institute of Architects (AIA)-affiliated, licensed architects.

Conrad Buff III FAIA (August 5, 1926 - October 10, 1988) was born in Eagle Rock, Los Angeles, California, to the creators of children's books Mary and Conrad Buff. His father Conrad Buff II was also a painter of the American southwest. Family acquaintances included Richard Neutra, Rudolph Schindler and opera singer Lawrence Tibbett; redesigning the Buff II garage was one of Neutra's first architectural commissions. Buff III attended local Eagle Rock schools. He graduated from U.S.C. School of Architecture in 1952. For ten years Buff was a faculty member of USC contributing design curriculum. Conrad served in the Navy in World War II at a base in Maryland, which was where he met his wife Elizabeth (Libby), a skipper's yeoman in the WAVES; film editor Conrad Buff IV is their son. After the War, Conrad decided to enroll at USC School of Architecture, where he met Donald Hensman, who had also returned from the War.

Donald C. Hensman FAIA (1924, Omaha, Nebraska - 2002) grew up in Hollywood, California. He served in the navy during World War II, as a parachute rigger in the South Pacific, and entered the USC architecture program by way of the GI Bill. It was at USC that Hensman met Conrad Buff. But prior to their collaboration with Straub, Buff and Hensman were designers of tract homes for a number of regional developers. He returned to teach architecture at his alma mater, USC from 1952 to 1963. He was eventually made assistant professor within USC's design curriculum and was chairman of the joint USC/American Institute of Architects education committee. Hensman remained active in the Pasadena architectural community until his death in 2002.

Calvin C. Straub FAIA (1920–1998) was born in Macon, Georgia. He studied at Texas A&M University and Pasadena City College before receiving his degree in architecture at the University of Southern California in 1945. After serving in the Navy, Straub lectured at USC from 1946 to 1961. Moving to Scottsdale, AZ in 1961 and joining the faculty at the College of Architecture at Arizona State University. Few architects and educators have had such a pervasive influence on architecture as Calvin C Straub.. He created an important body of work as the senior partner of Buff Straub and Hensmen, both previous students at USC. His work was widely published in Sunset Magazine and considered highly influential in shaping the vision iconography of the post-World War II contemporary southern Californian style. His and the firms work bridged the gap between the influences of early arts and crafts architects and the early California modernists, creating a uniquely regional architectural form. For this work and his educational contributions he was described in "Toward a simpler way of Life" as "the father of California post and beam architecture". His desert residence continued and extended the legacy of "design with climate" that he had begun decades again in southern California and preceded the now popular "green movement" in architecture by some 30 years. Until 1988 he held a professorship of design at Arizona State University in Tempe where his "world architecture" class attended by more than 15,000 general university students who were influenced by his contagious, jovial and animated love affair with the art of environmental design. He worked for the firm of A.B. Gallion before entering into a partnership with Conrad Buff and Donald Hensman (1956–61), and was a member of Schoneburger, Straub, Florence & Associates (1972–75). Straub also ran his own private practice in Arizona. He Received over 30 Honors and AIA awards. Apart from his work as an architect and lecturer, he also published Design Process and Communications (1978) and The Man-Made Environment: An Introduction to World Architecture and Design (1983). He retired in 1988 and died in 1998. His archives, drawings, project records, awards and project photographs many by famed Architectural photographer Julius Shulman are archived at the Arizona State University School of architecture library and archive.

== Partnership ==
In 1948, while both attending the University of Southern California (USC) School of Architecture and working together designing tract and model homes (but prior to beginning their practice), Buff and Hensman were asked by the Dean of the School of Architecture to take over the teaching duties left by the death of a senior professor. This meant that both Buff and Hensman were at the same time working professionals, students and teachers, all before being licensed or graduating. Both continued to teach and be associated with USC for many years.

In 1961 Calvin Straub left the practice to teach architecture at Arizona State University. Buff and Hensman continued their partnership as Buff, Hensman and Associates. Conrad Buff died in 1989 and Dennis Smith joined the partnership the same year to form Buff, Smith and Hensman, from which Hensman retired in 1998. Smith carries on in the practice, located in Pasadena.

The Buff, Straub, and Hensman firm's masterwork was Case Study House #20, the Saul Bass House (Altadena, 1958). It was built of factory-produced stressed skin panels and plywood vaults. Despite thorough engineering calculations, the architects were not awarded a building permit until a sample plywood vault had been temporarily erected and loaded with weights. Its open plan introduced the concept of zoning: the owner's zone with studio office, garden, master bedroom & bath; a formal zone with living and dining rooms and entry atrium; a family zone with kitchen, family room, dining terrace, two additional bedrooms and swimming pool.

Architect Calvin Straub's own post-and-beam home in Pasadena was another project that brought the practice commissions.

== Significant projects ==
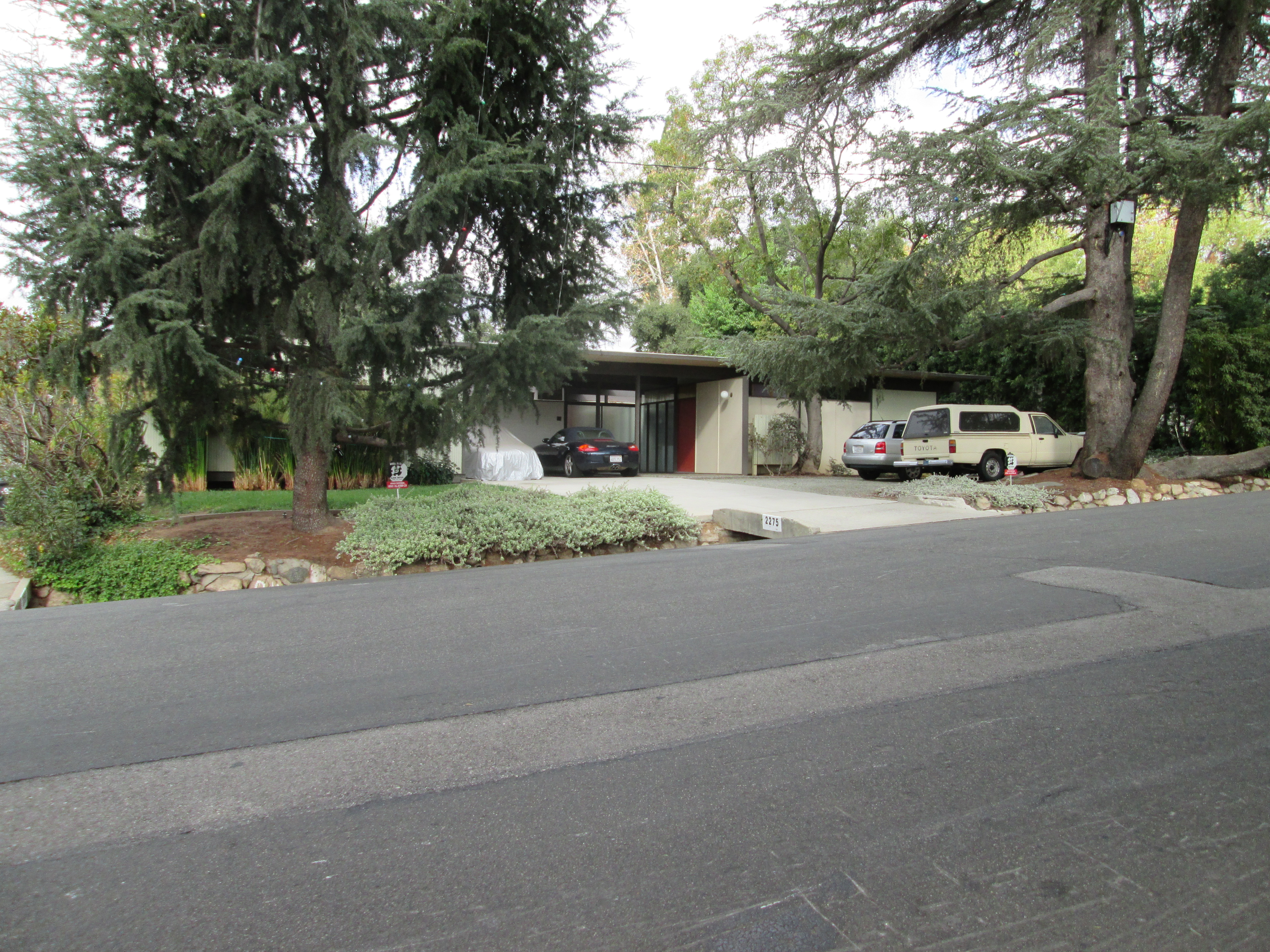
Case Study House #20B in 2014

- 1956 Mello Residence, Pasadena
- 1958 Saul Bass Residence (Case Study House #20B), Altadena
- 1959 Frank Residence, Pasadena
- 1959 Thompson Moseley House, Pasadena
- 1961 John Thomson Residence
- 1962 Sidney Fine Residence
- 1962 Residence for Mr. Steve McQueen, Los Angeles
- 1963 Residence for Mr & Mrs Marcus Whiffen, Phoenix Az.
- 1963 Harry Roth Residence, Beverly Hills
- Penn/Walter Van der Kamp Residence, Los Angeles

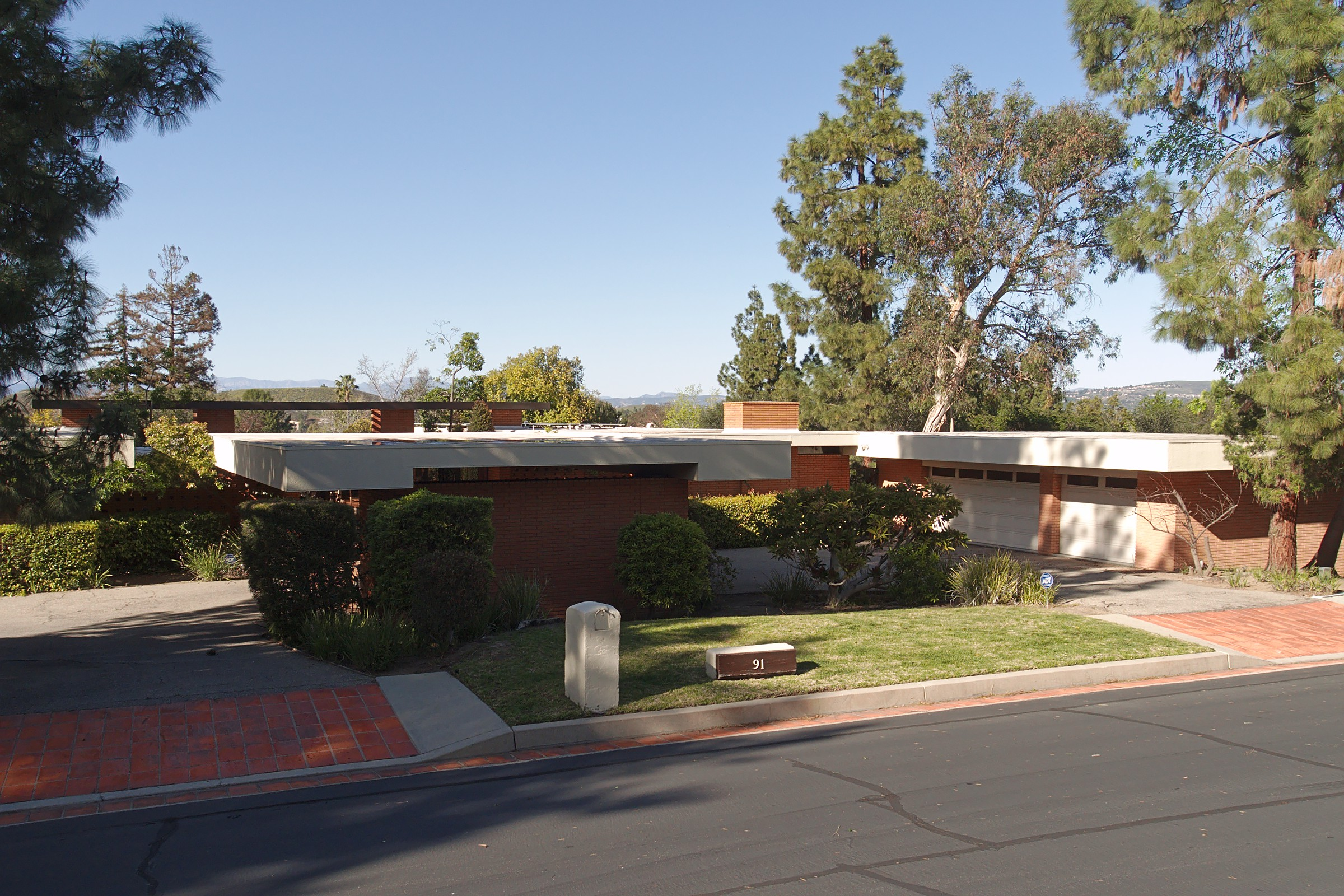
Case Study House #28 in 2015

- 1965 Case Study House #28
- 1967 M.C. Gill Residence, Pasadena
- 1968 Renovation for Judge Sandra Day O'Connor
- 1969 Laurence Harvey Residence, Palm Springs California
- 1969 Wong Residence, Los Angeles
- 1983 Harry Dorsey Residence, Playa del Rey, (AIA Pasadena and Foothill Chapter, Award of Merit 1984)

== Sources ==
- Case Study Houses by: Elizabeth Smith, Peter Goessel (ed). Taschen, February, 2002 ISBN 3-8228-6412-9, edited by Robert Winter, University of California Press, 1997 ISBN 0-520-20916-8
