= Marc Eugene Schiler =

American academic

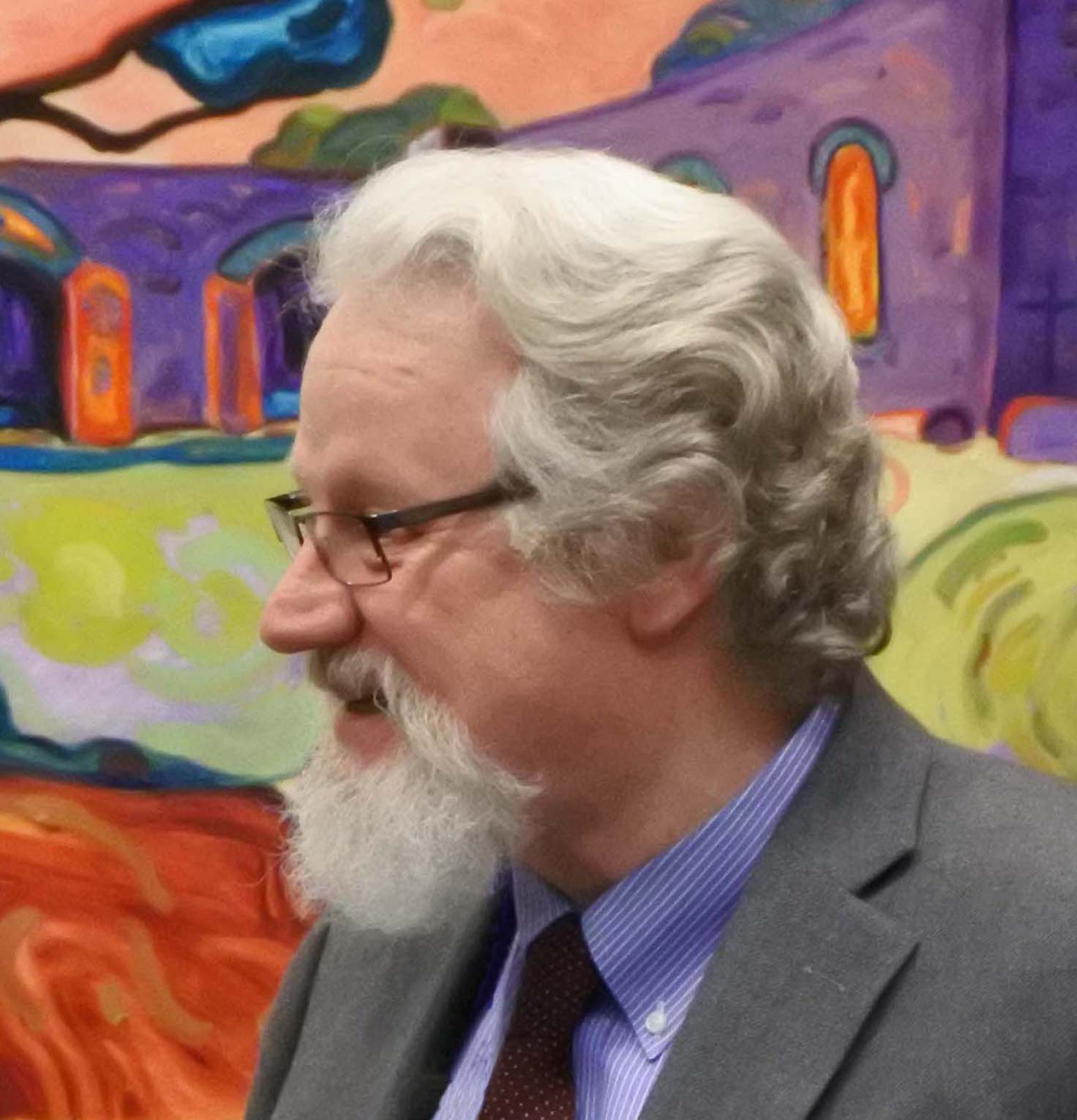
- Marc Eugene Schiler, FASES, LC
- Known for: Building Science, Environmental Control Systems, Glare and Daylighting
- Title: Faculty

Academic work
- Discipline: Architecture, Building Science
- Institutions: University of Southern California

Marc Eugene Schiler is a professor of the USC School of Architecture at the University of Southern California. He is a Fellow of the American Solar Energy Society and a winner of the Passive Solar Pioneer award in 2015. Schiler completed an undergraduate degree in architecture at USC School of Architecture and a Master of Architecture at Cornell University. He was an assistant professor of Architecture and Landscape Architecture at Cornell for four years prior to returning to USC in 1982. He was invited for a year to do research at the EMPA (Swiss Federal Laboratories for Materials Science and Technology). He served as a Fulbright Senior Scholar to the Middle East in 2002–2003 at the Technion – Israel Institute of Technology, Haifa and the Ben-Gurion University of the Negev, Sede Boqer. He has published more than 100 peer-reviewed scientific papers and authored or edited six books on environmental controls.

== Noted Pioneer in Reflected Visual Glare and Thermal Glare ==
Much of Schiler's recent work deals with reflected visual glare and thermal glare (concentrated radiant heat) from reflective buildings. One of the high-profile cases was the Walt Disney Concert Hall, which focused light into traffic intersections and heat onto the sidewalk and into other buildings. Schiler's analysis and advice allowed architect Frank Gehry and the building owner to resolve the complaints. Schiler has published on that and other similar situations, continuing to consult with Gehry and other prominent architects such as Coop Himmelblau so as to avoid such situations in subsequent projects. His work has pioneered a new field of study on this expanding issue found among state of the art Architectural buildings.

== Books by Schiler ==
- Schiler, Marc and L. Wertheimer; Building Systems 2009, Kaplan Publishing, ISBN 9781427770295, January 2009.
- Schiler, Marc, and S. Ahmed; Mechanical and Electrical Systems 2006, Kaplan Publishing, January 2006, ISBN 1419535595, ISBN 9781419535598, 2nd Ed. January 2007, ISBN 9781419596704 - ISBN 1419596705 (course and text)
- Schiler, Marc; Daylight Harvesting; the Gas Company Energy Research Center, Los Angeles, 1996.
- Anne Simon Moffat and Marc Schiler (1994). Energy Efficient and Environmental Landscaping; Appropriate Solutions Press.
- Marc Schiler; Simplified Design of Building Lighting; John Wiley and Sons, New York, August 1993.
- Marc Schiler (1991). Mechanical, Electrical, Plumbing and Life Safety Systems; Architectural Licensing Seminars.
- Marc Schiler, editor (1987). Simulating Daylight with Architectural Models; Daylighting Network of North America.
- Anne Simon Moffat and Marc Schiler (1981). Landscape Design that Saves Energy; William Morrow.
