= Pierre Koenig =

American architect and educator (1925–2004)

Pierre Francis Koenig
- Born: October 17, 1925; San Francisco, California, U.S.
- Died: April 4, 2004 (aged 78); Los Angeles, California, U.S.
- Education: University of Southern California
- Occupation: Architect
- Buildings: Case Study House #21; Case Study House #22

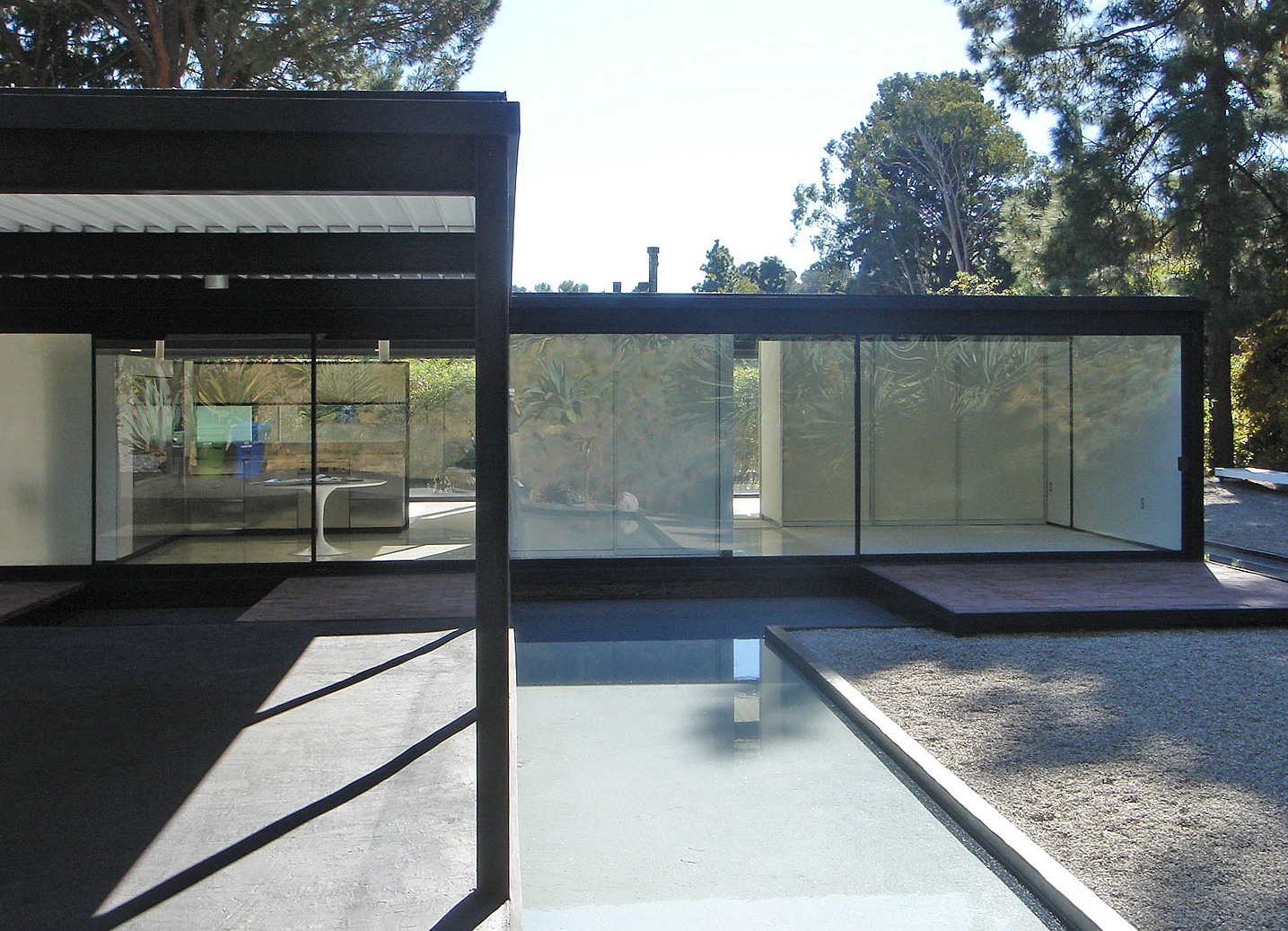
Case Study House #21, Los Angeles

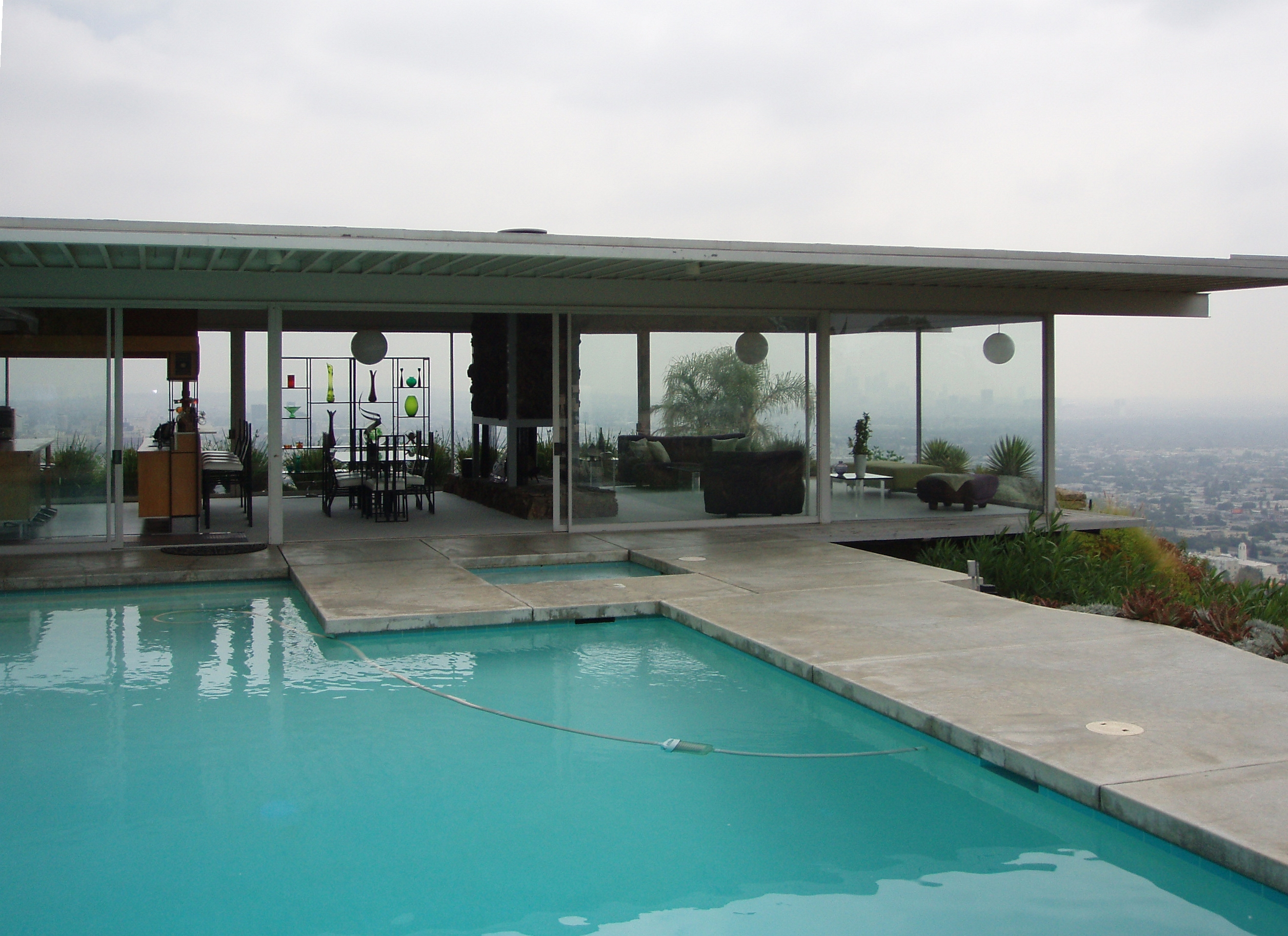
Case Study House #22, Los Angeles

Pierre Francis Koenig (October 17, 1925 – April 4, 2004) was an American architect and a Professor of Architecture at the University of Southern California. He taught at the USC School of Architecture from 1964 until his death in 2004. He was the director of the undergraduate building science program from 1980 to 2004. He lectured widely at other universities, and received more than 20 awards for his work. The architecture of Pierre Koenig was the subject of the book Pierre Koenig written by James Steele in 1998. Also in 1998, Koenig was elevated to "Distinguished Professor" after 35 years on the USC faculty. He received the USC Distinguished Alumni Award and the Gold Medal from the Los Angeles chapter of the American Institute of Architects.

== Early life ==
The son of a salesman, Koenig was born in San Francisco. The family moved to Southern California in 1939. After returning from a four-year tour in the Army during World War II, he enrolled in architecture school. He received his Bachelor of Architecture (B.Arch) degree from USC in 1952.

== Career ==
Koenig worked with Raphael Soriano and Edward H. Fickett among others, and began private practice in 1952. Koenig practiced mainly on the West Coast and was most notable for the design of the Case Study Houses No. 21 and 22 in 1960. Both 21 (the Bailey House) and 22 (the Stahl House) were constructed on dramatic, otherwise-unbuildable sites. Particularly the Case Study House #22, photographed by Julius Shulman, is widely considered the iconic postwar L.A. home, with its sweeping city views and openness to the outdoors.

At USC, Koenig led the undergraduate building science program and helped direct the Natural Forces Laboratory created by Ralph Lewis Knowles. The Building Science group at USC also included Knowles, Douglas E. Noble, Marc Schiler, Karen M. Kensek, Goetz Schierle, David Brindle, and Konrad Wachsmann.

Koenig died of leukemia in 2004 at 78. He was survived by his wife, Gloria; sons, Randall and Jean Pierre; and two stepsons, Barry and Thomas Kaufman.

In 2007, Koenig's Case Study House #21 sold at auction for $3.1 million. His personal residence in the Brentwood neighborhood of Los Angeles was built in 1985. After a restoration overseen by his stepsons, the steel and glass residence went up for sale in 2017 for $3.8 million.
