= List of University of Southern California people =

This is a list of notable alumni, faculty, and students from the University of Southern California. Those individuals who qualify for multiple categories have been placed under the section for which they are best known.

== Academia ==
- Melina Abdullah (PhD) – professor of Pan-African Studies at California State University, Los Angeles
- Anna Jean Ayres (B.A. 1945, M.A. 1954, Ph.D. 1961) – occupational therapist and developmental psychologist known for her work in the area of sensory processing disorder
- Iraj Ershaghi (M.A. 1968, Ph.D. 1972) – petroleum engineer; Omar B. Milligan Professor of Petroleum Engineering at the University of Southern California
- A.V. Balakrishnan (M.A. 1949, M.S. 1950, Ph.D. 1954) – applied mathematician; professor of mathematics at the University of California, Los Angeles; initially earned a masters in cinema
- Mohamed Bechri (Ph.D. in Economics) – Tunisian educator and human rights activist
- Thomas Bruice (B.S. 1950, Ph.D. 1954) - professor of chemistry and biochemistry at University of California, Santa Barbara
- Leo Buscaglia (B.A. 1950, M.A. 1954, Ph.D. 1963) – educator, best-selling author
- George V. Chilingar (B.S. 1949, M.S. 1950, Ph.D. 1956) – distinguished petroleum geologist
- Nicholas T. Clerk (MPA 1966, DPA 1972) – Ghanaian academic, administrator and Presbyterian minister, Rector, Ghana Institute of Management and Public Administration (1977–1982)
- Fred Cohen (Ph.D. 1986) – computer scientist; inventor of computer virus defense techniques
- Daniel Diermeier (M.A.) – chancellor at Vanderbilt University
- Anita Elberse (M.A.) – Lincoln Filene Professor of Business Administration at Harvard Business School
- Andrew A. Frank (M.S. 1965, Ph.D. 1968) – professor of mechanical and aeronautical engineering at UC Davis; the father of modern plug-in hybrid electric vehicles (PHEV)
- Emily Fridlund – author of History of Wolves
- Alice Gast (B.S. 1980) – president of Imperial College London
- George Gerbner (M.A. 1951, Ph.D. 1955) – communication theorist; founder of cultivation theory
- Piara Singh Gill (B.S. 1935, M.S. 1936) – pioneer in cosmic ray nuclear physics
- Alfred Gottschalk (Ph.D. 1965) – president of Hebrew Union College and leader in the Reform Judaism movement
- Robert M. Gray (Ph.D. 1966) – information theorist; professor of electrical engineering at Stanford University
- J. E. "Joe" Greene (B.S. 1967, M.S. 1968, Ph.D. 1971) – materials scientist
- Garland Greever (1883–1967) – English professor and textbook author
- Loren Grey (B.A. 1939, M.S. 1954, Ph.D. 1959) – author and educational psychologist
- Melissa Grunlan (Ph.D. 2004) – professor in the Department of Biomedical Engineering at Texas A&M University
- Adam Herbert (B.A. 1966, M.P.A. 1968) – president, Indiana University
- Dale R. Herspring (PhD 1972) – professor of political science at Kansas State University
- Philip G. Hoffman (M.A. 1942) – former president of the University of Houston, first chancellor of the University of Houston System
- John B. Hogenesch (B.A. 1989, B.S. 1991) – chronobiologist, professor of Pharmacology at University of Pennsylvania, discovered the essential circadian clock gene Bmal1
- Howard P. House (M.D. 1935) – ear specialist and founder of the House Ear Institute
- Ayanna Howard (M.S. 1994, Ph.D. 1999) – roboticist, professor at the Georgia Institute of Technology
- Darnell Hunt (B.A. Journalism 1984) – dean of Social Sciences at UCLA
- Amando Kapauan (Ph.D. 1959) – chemist and researcher
- Kent M. Keith (Ed. D.) – president of Pacific Rim Christian University, 2015-2020
- Jonathan Kellerman (Ph.D. 1974) – clinical psychologist and writer
- Barry Kerzin (Ph.D. 1976) – professor of medicine, Buddhist monk and teacher, and personal physician to the Dalai Lama
- Satinder Vir Kessar (Ph.D. 1958) – organic chemist, Shanti Swarup Bhatnagar laureate
- Matin Ahmed Khan – dean and director, Institute of Business Administration, Karachi, 1972–77
- Douglas Kmiec (J.D. 1976) – Caruso Family Chair, professor of Constitutional Law, Pepperdine University
- Ellis O. Knox (M.A. 1928, Ph.D. 1931) – educator, first African-American to be awarded a Ph.D. on the West Coast
- Bart Kosko (B.A. 1982) – Hybrid intelligent system expert and science fiction writer
- Anthony Lazzaro (B.S. 1948) – USC senior vice president
- Minnette Gersh Lenier (Ph.D. 1971) – teacher who used magic to improve students' learning skills
- Paul Locatelli (Ph.D. 1971) – former president and professor of accounting at Santa Clara University
- Cloyd H. Marvin (A.B, 1915) – educator, longest serving president of the George Washington University
- Catherine McBride-Chang (M.A. 1992, Ph.D. 1994) – developmental psychologist and early literacy researcher
- John Mearsheimer (M.A. 1974) – political scientist; professor of political science at the University of Chicago
- Gérard G. Medioni (Ph.D. 1983) – computer scientist, author, academic and inventor
- Max More (Ph.D. 1995) – philosopher and futurist, founder of Extropy Institute
- James Porter Moreland (Ph.D. 1985) – professor of philosophy at Talbot School of Theology at Biola University
- William Moritz (Ph.D. 1968) – film historian
- Dennis J. Murray (M.P.A. 1971, Ph.D. 1977) – president of Marist College
- Hagop Panossian – aerospace engineer, academic and philanthropist
- Boris Podolsky (B.S.E.E. 1918, M.S. 1926) – physicist
- S. James Press – statistician
- Nemesio Prudente (Ph.D. 1959) – president of the Polytechnic University of the Philippines and political activist
- Edith Abigail Purer (Ph.D. 1933) – botanist
- Alison Dundes Renteln (J.D. 1991) – political scientist, professor of Political Science, Anthropology, Public Policy and Law at the University of Southern California
- Ian Roberts (Ph.D. 1985) – linguist; professor of Linguistics at the University of Cambridge
- Norman Sadeh – computer scientist; professor at Carnegie Mellon University
- Bernard Salick (M.D. 1964) – medical entrepreneur, nephrologist
- Gordon H. Sato (B.S. 1951) – biochemist; former director of the W. Alton Jones Cell Science Center; founder of the Manzanar Project
- Gretchen Sibley (A. M. 1946) – zoologist, founder of the docent program at the Los Angeles County Museum of Natural History, first executive director of the California State Science Fair
- Rangaswamy Srinivasan (Ph.D. 1956) – discoverer of Ablative Photodecomposition (APD) and co-inventor of the LASIK procedure
- Susan Straight (B.A. 1981) – published writer and novelist, professor at the University of California, Riverside
- Shang-Hua Teng (M.S. 1988) – computer scientist; chairman of the Computer Science Department at the Viterbi School of Engineering
- Norman Topping (B.A. 1933, M.D. 1936) – former university president and NIH associate director; helped develop a typhus vaccine and the first effective treatment against Rocky Mountain spotted fever
- Laura Skandera Trombley (Ph.D. 1989) – president of Pitzer College
- Cecilia Velástegui – author
- Andrew Viterbi (Ph.D. 1962) – inventor of the Viterbi algorithm, CDMA, co-founder of Qualcomm and benefactor of the Viterbi School of Engineering

== Architecture ==
- Gregory Ain (attended the School of Architecture 1927–28) FAIA – architect active in the mid-20th century
- Joel Bergman (B.Arch. 1965) FAIA – architect, designer of several landmark casinos
- Al Boeke (B.Arch. 1948) – developer of Sea Ranch, California
- Eugene Kinn Choy (B.Arch 1939) – architect and principle of Choi Associates; first Chinese-American graduate of the USC School of Architecture
- Boris Dramov (1966) – architect and principle of ROMA Design Group
- Sidney Eisenshtat (B.Arch. 1935) – architect, best known for synagogues and Jewish academic buildings
- Edward H. Fickett (B.Arch. 1937) FAIA – architect, consultant to federal and local governments
- Frank Gehry (B.Arch. 1954, honorary doctorate 2000) FAIA – Canadian-American Pritzker Prize-winning architect
- Alvin Huang (B.Arch. 1998) – Chinese-American architect, founder of Synthesis Design + Architecture, and tenured faculty at USC School of Architecture
- Jon Jerde (B.Arch. 1964) FAIA – architect, founder and chairman of The Jerde Partnership
- Edward Killingsworth (B.Arch. 1940) FAIA – architect best known as a participant in Arts & Architecture's Case Study program in the mid-1950s
- Pierre Koenig (B.Arch. 1952) FAIA – architect known for his exposed steel and glass houses
- Harold Levitt (1921–2003) – architect, designed homes for the rich and famous
- Carl Maston (B.Arch. 1936) – Mid-Century Modern architect and USC Distinguished Alumni Award recipient in 1989
- Thom Mayne (B.Arch. 1968) FAIA – principal of Morphosis, Pritzker Prize laureate, and co-founder of Southern California Institute of Architecture (SCI-ARC)
- Ildefonso P. Santos Jr. (B.Arch. 1956, M.Arch. 1950) – National Artist of the Philippines in Architecture
- Allen Siple (1900–1973) – architect
- Raphael Soriano (B.Arch. 1934) FAIA – architect and educator, helped define the mid-century modern period
- Paul Revere Williams (B.S. 1919) – architect, designed the homes of numerous celebrities, first African American member of the American Institute of Architects
- Bernard Zimmerman – Modernist architect, longtime educator at the Cal Poly Pomona College of Environmental Design

== Art ==
- Amber Aguirre (B.F.A. 1981) – ceramic sculptor
- F. Carlton Ball (B.A. 1932, M.A. 1934) – multidisciplinary artist, author, and educator; known for his large-scale pottery
- Edith Baumann (M.F.A. 1985) – abstract artist
- Khalil Bendib (M.A. 1982) – political cartoonist
- Art Clokey (M.A. 1956) – clay animator; creator of Gumby
- Graham Goddard – artist
- James Grant (B.S., c. 1945) – painter, sculptor
- Corita Kent (M.A. 1951) – artist
- Doyle Lane – ceramic artist
- Elad Lassry (M.F.A. 2007) – artist
- Paul McCarthy (M.F.A. 1973) – artist
- Kenneth Price (B.F.A. 1956) – ceramic artist and printmaker
- Susan Rankaitis (M.F.A. 1977) – artist
- Marion Sampler – graphic artist (B. A. 1955)
- Ada Mae Sharpless (B. A. 1922) – sculptor
- Brad Thor (B.A. 1992) – author
- Delmer J. Yoakum (attended the Roski School of Fine Arts) – artist

== Astronauts ==
- Neil Armstrong (1960s and 1970, graduate studies) (M.S. Aerospace Engineering) – astronaut and the first person to walk on the Moon, NASA X-15 pilot
- Charles A. Bassett, II (1960s, graduate studies) – Air Force test pilot, was selected as a NASA astronaut in 1963 but died in an airplane crash during training for his first spaceflight
- Karol J. Bobko (1970, M.S. Aerospace Engineering) – engineer, Air Force officer and USAF and NASA astronaut
- Charles F. Bolden Jr. (1977, M.S. Systems Management) – Space Shuttle commander; Administrator of NASA
- Gerald P. Carr (1954, B.S. Mechanical Engineering) – colonel in the Marine Corps and NASA astronaut
- Nancy J. Currie (1985, M.S. Systems Management) – engineer, Army officer and NASA astronaut
- William H. Dana (1958, M.S. Aerospace Engineering) – NASA test pilot and astronaut
- Brian Duffy (1981, M.S. Systems Management) – U.S. Air Force colonel and NASA astronaut
- Henry C. Gordon (1966, M.B.A.) – X-20 Dyna-Soar astronaut and a colonel in the Air Force
- Nathan J. Lindsay (1976, M.S. Systems Management) – major general in the Air Force
- Jerry M. Linenger (1988, M.S. Systems Management) – captain in the Navy Medical Corps, and NASA astronaut
- James A. Lovell (1961, Aviation Safety School) – NASA astronaut and captain in the Navy, most famous as commander of Apollo 13 mission
- Carlos I. Noriega (1981, B.S. Computer Science) – NASA astronaut and Marine Corps lieutenant colonel
- Kenneth S. Reightler Jr. (1984, M.S. Systems Management) – NASA astronaut
- Walter M. Schirra (1969, honorary doctorate in Science) – test pilot, Navy officer, and one of the original Mercury Seven astronauts chosen for Project Mercury
- Pierre J. Thuot (1985, M.S. Systems Management) – Navy captain and NASA astronaut

== Athletics ==
=== American football ===
The University of Southern California has had a number of notable American football players. The following list includes all former USC football players who have articles on Wikipedia. Please note: some former players may be listed elsewhere due to other achievements (i.e. John Wayne and Ward Bond, became better known as actors; Quincy Woods became better known as an Olympian, etc.).

- George Achica – Consensus All-American
- Erik Affholter (born 1966) – NFL wide receiver
- DelVaughn Alexander
- Marcus Allen – Heisman Trophy winner, College Football Hall of Fame Pro Football Hall of Fame
- Marcell Allmond
- John Allred
- Charlie Ane Jr.
- Sam Anno
- Marger Apsit
- Kevin Arbet
- Jon Arnett – College Football Hall of Fame
- Earl Audet
- Don Avery
- Red Badgro – Pro Football Hall of Famer
- Bill Bain
- Johnny Baker – College Football Hall of Fame, All-American
- Terry Baker (J.D. 1968) – College Football Hall of Fame, Heisman Trophy winner at Oregon State, played quarterback in NFL and CFL
- Sam Baker – two-time All-American
- Chip Banks
- Al Bansavage
- Bradford Banta
- Jack Banta
- Kurt Barber
- Nate Barragar
- Al Barry
- Joe Barry
- Mike Battle
- Pete Beathard
- Hal Bedsole
- Ricky Bell – College Football Hall of Fame
- Duane Bickett
- Darnell Bing
- Bob Blackman
- Mel Bleeker (1920–1996) – National Football League player
- John David Booty
- Tony Boselli
- Mark Boyer
- Hoby Brenner
- Lou Brock Jr.
- Booker Brown
- Tay Brown – College Football Hall of Fame
- Joey Browner
- Keith Browner
- Will Buchanon
- Brad Budde – College Football Hall of Fame
- David Buehler
- Rudy Bukich
- Frank Buncom
- DeChon Burns
- Reggie Bush – Heisman Trophy winner, since vacated
- Ray Butler
- Dominique Byrd
- Dave Cadigan
- Lynn Cain
- Leo Calland
- Al Carmichael
- Mark Carrier
- Chris Cash
- Matt Cassel
- Bob Chandler
- Chris Claiborne – Butkus Award winner
- Travis Claridge
- Don Clark
- Monte Clark
- Leon Clarke
- Paul Cleary – College Football Hall of Fame
- Garry Cobb
- Shaun Cody
- Angelo Coia
- Keary Colbert
- Tony Colorito
- Curtis Conway
- Rashard Cook
- Marcus Cotton
- Al Cowlings
- Jeff Cravath
- Lindon Crow
- Sam Cunningham
- Brian Cushing – NFL Pro Bowler
- Mario Danelo
- Anthony Davis – College Football Hall of Fame
- Clarence Davis
- Fred Davis
- Derrick Deese
- Jack Del Rio
- Hershel Dennis
- Kori Dickerson
- Don Doll
- Morley Drury – College Football Hall of Fame
- Coye Dunn
- Dennis Edwards
- Sedrick Ellis
- Kevin Ellison
- Riki Ellison
- Dick Enright
- Ricky Ervins
- Charlie Evans
- Charlie Evans – former NFL running back
- Vince Evans
- Justin Fargas
- John Ferraro – College Football Hall of Fame
- Craig Fertig
- Bob Fisher
- Jeff Fisher
- Bill Fisk
- James Fitzpatrick
- Chris Foote
- Cole Ford
- Lonnie Ford
- Roy Foster
- Scott Galbraith
- Mike Garrett – College Football Hall of Fame, Heisman Trophy winner; USC Athletic Director (1993–2010)
- Norberto Garrido
- Mike Garzoni
- William Gay
- David Gibson
- Frank Gifford – College Football Hall of Fame, Pro Football Hall of Fame; TV analyst
- Bill Gray
- Matt Grootegoed
- Gregg Guenther
- Pat Haden – All-American QB; Rhodes Scholar; NFL Pro-Bowler; TV analyst, current athletic director, USC
- Willie Hall
- Mike Haluchak
- Brandon Hancock
- Travis Hannah
- Jim Hardy
- Pat Harlow
- Cary Harris
- Carter Hartwig
- Bob Hendren
- Ed Henke
- Ed Hervey
- Ralph Heywood
- Jesse Hibbs
- Donnie Hickman
- Fred Hill
- Jess Hill
- Bob Hoffman
- John Hoffman
- Lamont Hollinquest
- Alex Holmes
- Mike Holmgren
- Leroy Holt
- Hudson Houck
- Pat Howell
- Mike Hull
- John Jackson
- Lawrence Jackson
- Dwayne Jarrett
- Gary Jeter
- Keyshawn Johnson
- Rob Johnson
- Winston Justice
- Mort Kaer – College Football Hall of Fame
- Ryan Kalil
- Norm Katnik
- Brian Kelly
- Kareem Kelly
- Ryan Killeen
- David Kirtman
- Bob Klein
- Sammy Knight
- Jeff Kopp
- Al Krueger
- Jason Leach
- Brad Leggett
- Matt Leinart – Heisman Trophy winner
- Dave Lewis
- Karl Lorch
- Ronnie Lott – College Football Hall of Fame, Pro Football Hall of Famer
- Oscar Lua
- Taitusi Lutui
- Malaefou MacKenzie
- Kaluka Maiava
- Tom Malone
- Todd Marinovich
- Rod Martin
- Bruce Matthews
- Clay Matthews Jr.
- Clay Matthews III – NFL Pro Bowler, Super Bowl Champion
- Grant Mattos
- Fred Matua
- Rey Maualuga
- Ray May
- Taylor Mays
- Bob McCaffrey
- Earl McCullouch
- Sultan McCullough
- Daylon McCutcheon
- Mike McDonald
- Paul McDonald
- Tim McDonald
- Chris McFoy
- Willie McGinest
- Larry McGrew
- Marlin McKeever
- Mike McKeever – College Football Hall of Fame
- Dan McMillan
- Bob McNeish
- Johnny McWilliams
- John Michels
- Billy Miller
- Jason Mitchell
- Ron Mix – Pro Football Hall of Famer
- Fili Moala
- Marv Montgomery
- Kyle Moore
- Zeke Moreno
- Boyd Morgan
- Daniel Morgan
- Pat Morris
- Chad Morton
- Johnnie Morton
- Don Mosebar
- Gerry Mullins
- Anthony Munoz – Pro Football Hall of Famer
- Jim Musick
- Bill Nelsen
- Rick Neuheisel (J.D. 1988) – head coach (played football at UCLA)
- Jim Obradovich
- Ifeanyi Ohalete
- Pat O'Hara
- Dan Owens
- Carson Palmer – Heisman Trophy winner
- Petros Papadakis
- Mike Patterson
- Rodney Peete
- Nick Perry
- Volney Peters
- Charles Phillips
- Erny Pinckert – College Football Hall of Fame
- Kennedy Pola
- Troy Polamalu – All-American; NFL Pro Bowler; Super Bowl Champion
- Will Poole
- Ryan Powdrell
- Marvin Powell – College Football Hall of Fame
- Jim Psaltis
- Marc Raab
- Chilo Rachal
- Bill Radovich
- Drew Radovich
- Mike Rae
- LaJuan Ramsey
- Danny Reece
- Kris Richard
- Bernard Riley
- Steve Riley
- Keith Rivers
- C. R. Roberts
- Jacob Rogers
- Aaron Rosenberg – College Football Hall of Fame, 2x All-American, and film and television producer
- Tim Rossovich
- Karl Rubke
- Frostee Rucker
- Ken Ruettgers
- Darrell Russell
- Tim Ryan
- Eddie Saenz
- Paul Salata
- Sean Salisbury – ESPN football analyst
- Mark Sanchez – 2009 Rose Bowl Offensive MVP
- Mike Sanford
- Dallas Sartz
- Henry Schmidt
- Bill Schultz
- Jim Sears
- Junior Seau – NFL Pro Bowler
- Jason Sehorn
- Rocky Seto
- Rod Sherman
- Antuan Simmons
- O. J. Simpson – Heisman Trophy winner, College Football Hall of Fame; Pro Football Hall of Fame
- Tony Slaton
- Dennis Smith
- Ernie Smith – College Football Hall of Fame
- Harry Smith – College Football Hall of Fame
- Sid Smith
- Steve Smith – NFL Pro Bowler
- Tody Smith
- R. Jay Soward
- Matt Spanos
- Markus Steele
- Bob Svihus
- Lynn Swann – College Football Hall of Fame, Pro Football Hall of Fame; TV analyst
- Calvin Sweeney
- Lofa Tatupu – NFL Pro Bowler
- Mosi Tatupu
- Brice Taylor
- Mike Taylor
- Skip Thomas
- Terrell Thomas
- Dennis Thurman
- Mark Tucker
- Patrick Turner
- Kenechi Udeze
- Keith Van Horne
- Lenny Vandermade
- John Vella
- Jim Vellone
- Kyle Wachholtz
- Lowell Wagner
- Glen Walker
- John Walker
- Cotton Warburton – College Football Hall of Fame
- Scott Ware
- Chauncey Washington
- Charlie Weaver
- Lee Webb
- Charles White – Heisman Trophy winner, College Football Hall of Fame
- LenDale White
- Brian Williams
- Caleb Williams – Heisman Trophy winner, NFL first round draft pick
- Eric Williams
- Johnny Williams
- Kyle Williams
- Mike Williams – NFL first round draft pick
- Thomas Williams
- Matt Willig
- Ben Wilson
- Richard Wood – College Football Hall of Fame
- Willie Wood – Pro Football Hall of Fame
- Manuel Wright
- Justin Wyatt
- Ron Yary – College Football Hall of Fame, Pro Football Hall of Fame
- Adrian Young – All-American
- Charle Young – College Football Hall of Fame

=== Baseball ===
- Gabe Alvarez
- Brian Bannister
- Bret Barberie – former Major League Baseball infielder; Olympic gold medalist
- Jim Barr (B.S. B.A. 1970) – former Major League Baseball (MLB) pitcher
- Aaron Boone – professional baseball player 1997–2009
- Bret Boone – professional baseball player 1992–2005
- Bill Bordley
- Damon Buford
- Don Buford
- Jeff Cirillo
- Jeff Clement
- Rich Dauer
- Rod Dedeaux (B.S. B.A. 1935) – legendary USC Trojans baseball coach and member of 1935 Brooklyn Dodgers
- Lucas Duda
- Dave Engle
- Morgan Ensberg – professional baseball player, 2000–2009, 2005 all-star
- Seth Etherton
- Ron Fairly – former Major League Baseball player and broadcaster
- Randy Flores
- Ron Flores
- Mike Gillespie
- George Grande
- Jess Hill
- Kyle Hurt – pitcher for the Los Angeles Dodgers (2023–present)
- Geoff Jenkins – professional baseball player 1998–2008
- Randy Johnson – professional baseball pitcher 1988–2009
- Jacque Jones – professional baseball player 1999–2008
- Steve Kemp – professional baseball player 1977–1988
- Ian Kennedy
- Dave Kingman – professional baseball player 1971–1986
- Rene Lachemann – former MLB manager
- Jason Lane – professional baseball player 2002–2014
- Barry Latman – professional baseball player
- Bill Lee – MLB pitcher
- Justin Lehr – MLB pitcher
- Bob Lillis
- Fred Lynn – professional baseball player 1974–1990
- Mark McGwire – professional baseball player 1986–2001
- Chad Moeller – MLB catcher
- Eric Munson – professional baseball player 2000–2009
- Stu Pederson – MLB player
- Mark Prior – professional baseball pitcher 2003–2013
- Anthony Reyes – MLB pitcher
- Blake Sabol (born 1998) – baseball player for the San Francisco Giants
- Tom Seaver (B.A. 1975) – professional baseball Hall of Fame pitcher 1967–1986
- Al Silvera (1935–2002) – MLB player
- Bob Skube
- Roy Smalley – professional baseball player 1975–1987
- Mark Smith
- Robert Stock (born 1989) – MLB baseball pitcher
- CJ Stubbs – MLB baseball catcher
- Garrett Stubbs (born 1993) – MLB baseball catcher
- Gary Sutherland
- Bobby Valentine – professional baseball pitcher 1969–1979, MLB Manager 1985–2012
- Ben Wanger (M.S. '20) – American-Israeli baseball pitcher, Team Israel
- Barry Zito – professional baseball pitcher 2000–2015

=== Basketball ===
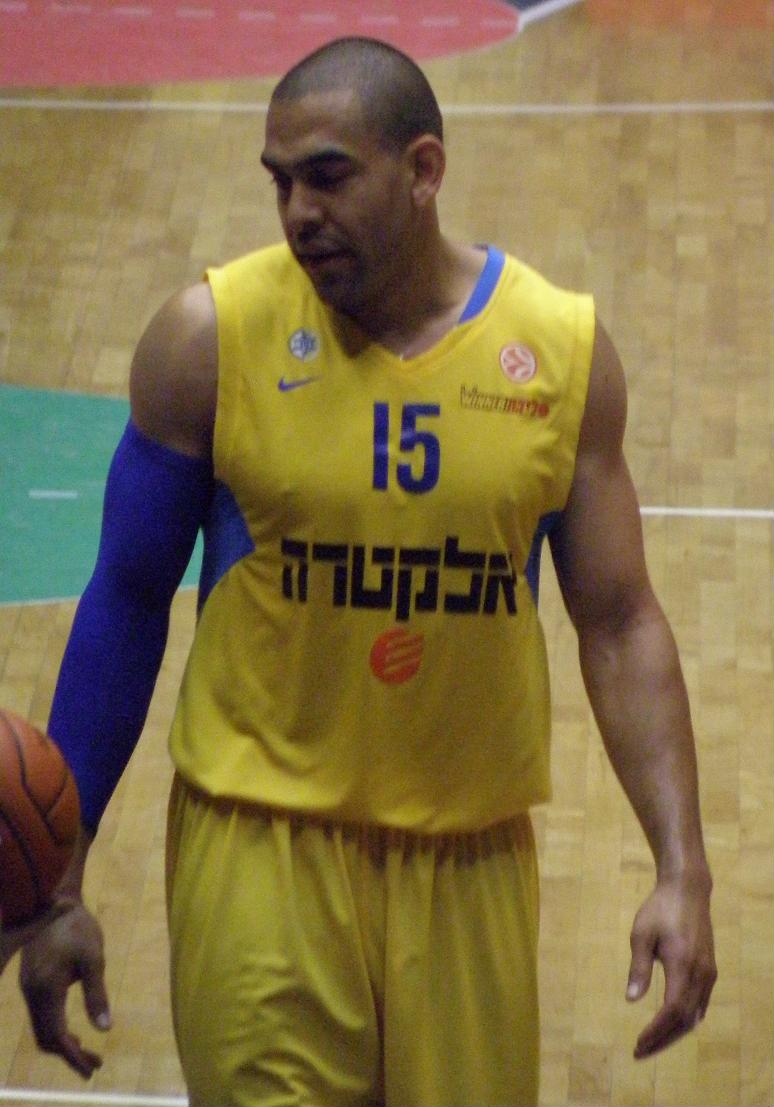
David Blu

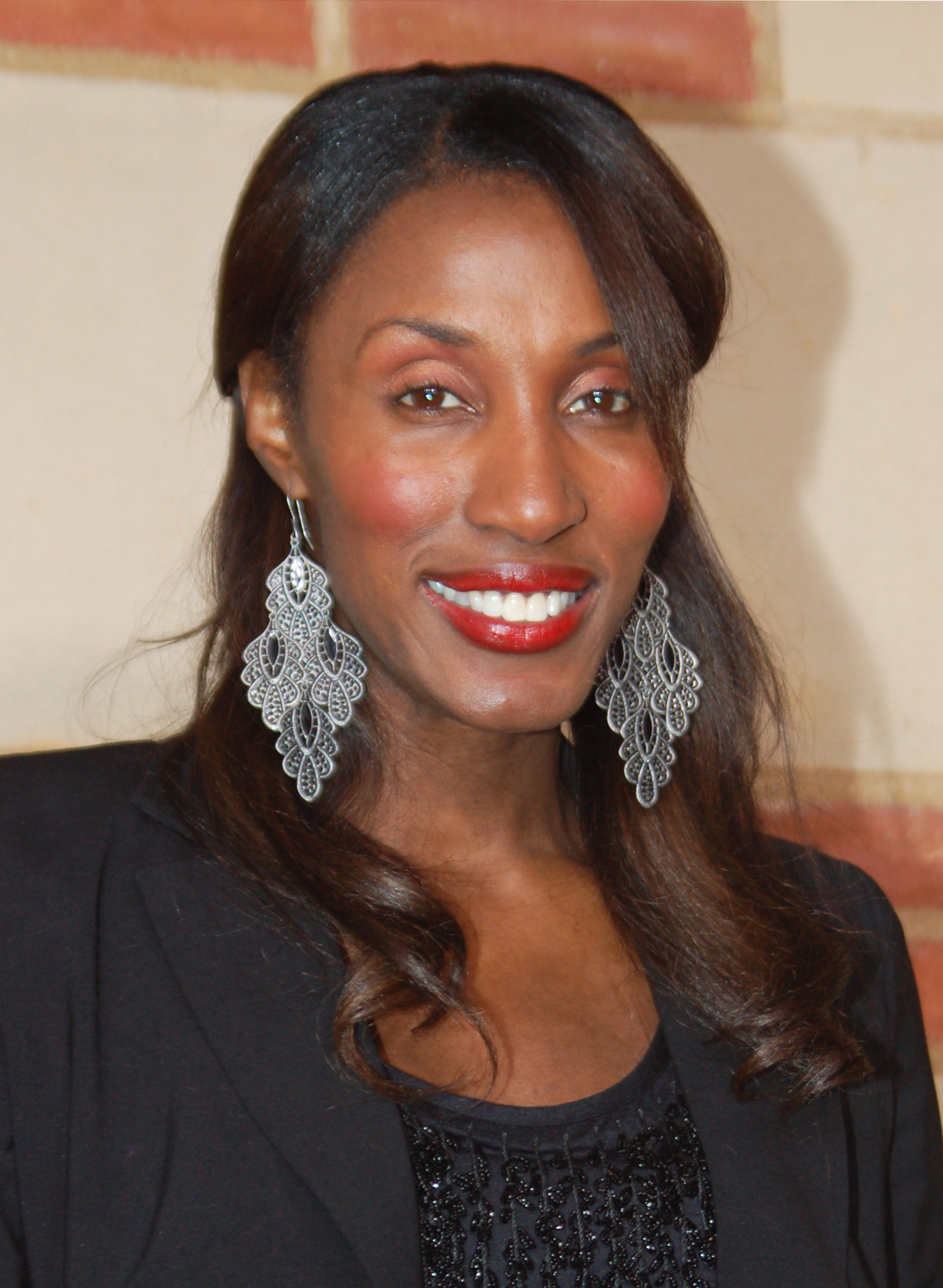
Lisa Leslie

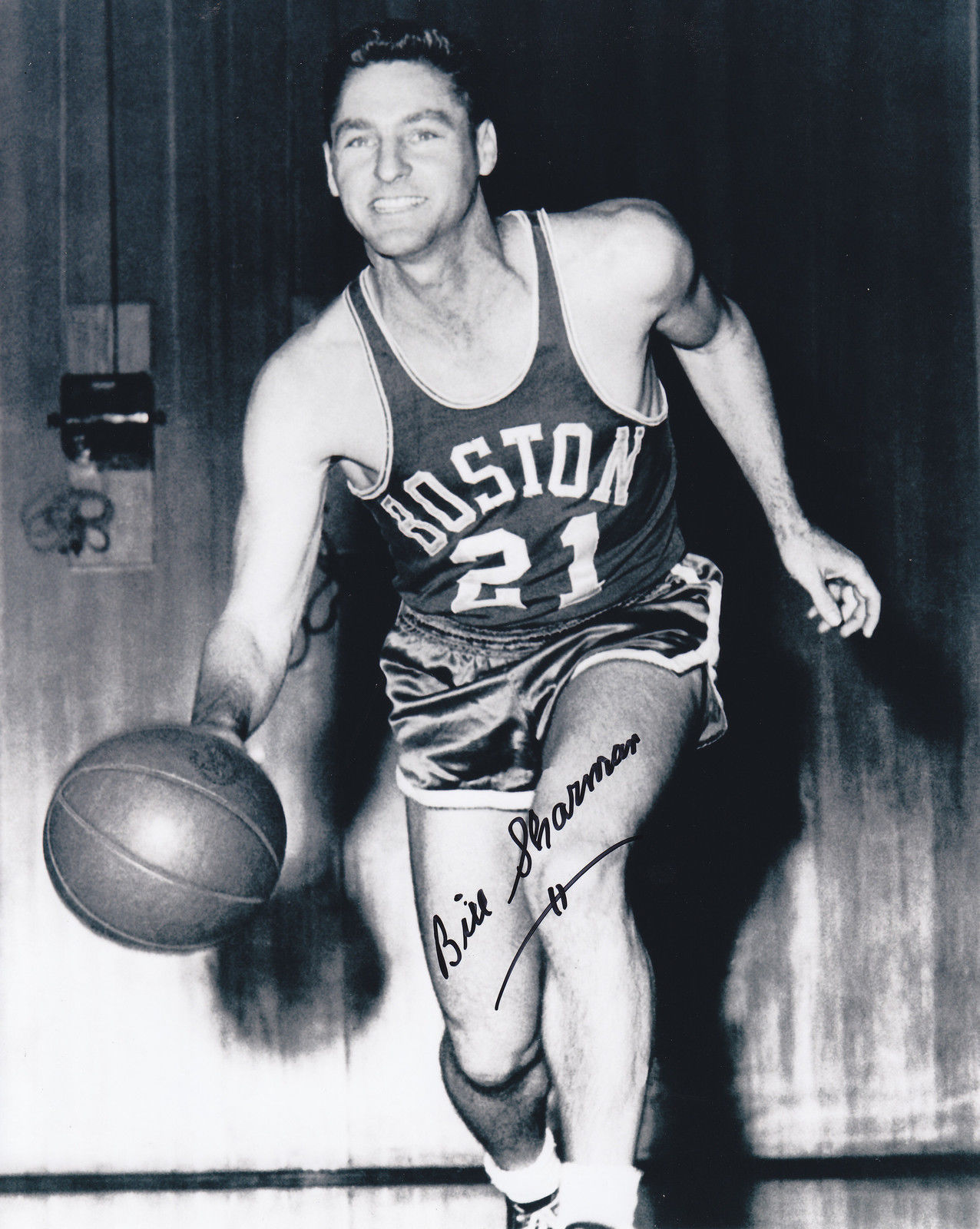
Bill Sharman

- Elías Larry Ayuso – professional basketball player
- David Bluthenthal (now "Blu"; born 1980) – American-Israeli professional basketball player; Israel men's national basketball team
- Cynthia Cooper-Dyke – professional basketball player, two-time Olympic medalist, member of both the Naismith Memorial and Women's Basketball Halls of Fame
- DeMar DeRozan – professional basketball player with the Denver Nuggets, drafted 9th overall in the 2009 NBA draft by the Toronto Raptors; 4x Allstar
- Desmon Farmer – professional basketball player with Ironi Ashkelon
- Taj Gibson – professional basketball player with the Charlotte Hornets
- Daniel Hackett – professional basketball player with the Olympiacos B.C.
- Kiki Iriafen – WNBA player, first round draft pick of the Washington Mystics
- Bronny James – professional basketball player with the Los Angeles Lakers
- Davon Jefferson (born 1986) – basketball player in the Israeli Basketball Premier League
- Lisa Leslie – WNBA player for Los Angeles Sparks, four-time Olympic champion, member of the Naismith and Women's Halls of Fame
- Evan Mobley – professional basketball player with the Cleveland Cavaliers, drafted 3rd overall in the 2021 NBA draft
- Isaiah Mobley – professional basketball player for Delaware Blue Coats
- Steve Malovic (1956–2007) – basketball player
- Ryan Marks – men's college basketball coach
- O. J. Mayo – professional basketball player with the Milwaukee Bucks
- Barry Migliorini – American Basketball Association head coach
- Cheryl Miller – member of both the Naismith and Women's Halls of Fame, former USC women's coach
- Harold Miner – NBA player and slam dunk contest champion
- Jerry Nemer (1912–1980) – basketball player and attorney
- Kevin Porter Jr. – professional basketball player for Milwaukee Bucks
- Nick Rakocevic – professional basketball player in Asian leagues
- Brian Scalabrine – NBA forward for the Chicago Bulls, NBA champion with the Boston Celtics
- Bill Sharman – player and coach, Basketball Hall of Famer
- Elijah Stewart (born 1995) – basketball player for Hapoel Eilat of the Israeli Basketball Premier League
- Tina Thompson – WNBA player, two-time Olympic champion
- Paul Westphal – professional basketball player, current head coach at Pepperdine University
- Tex Winter – basketball coach (inventor of the triangle offense)
- Nick Young – professional basketball player with the Los Angeles Lakers

=== Golf ===
- Nicole Castrale (B.A. 2001) – LPGA professional golfer
- Sean Crocker – golf pro on the PGA European Tour
- Al Geiberger (B.A. 1959) – professional golfer
- Brian Henninger – professional golfer
- Anna Rawson – LPGA professional golfer
- Jennifer Rosales – LPGA professional golfer
- Scott Simpson (B.S. B.A. 1978) – professional golfer
- Craig Stadler – professional golfer
- Kevin Stadler (B.A. 2002) – professional golfer
- Dave Stockton – professional golfer

=== Tennis ===
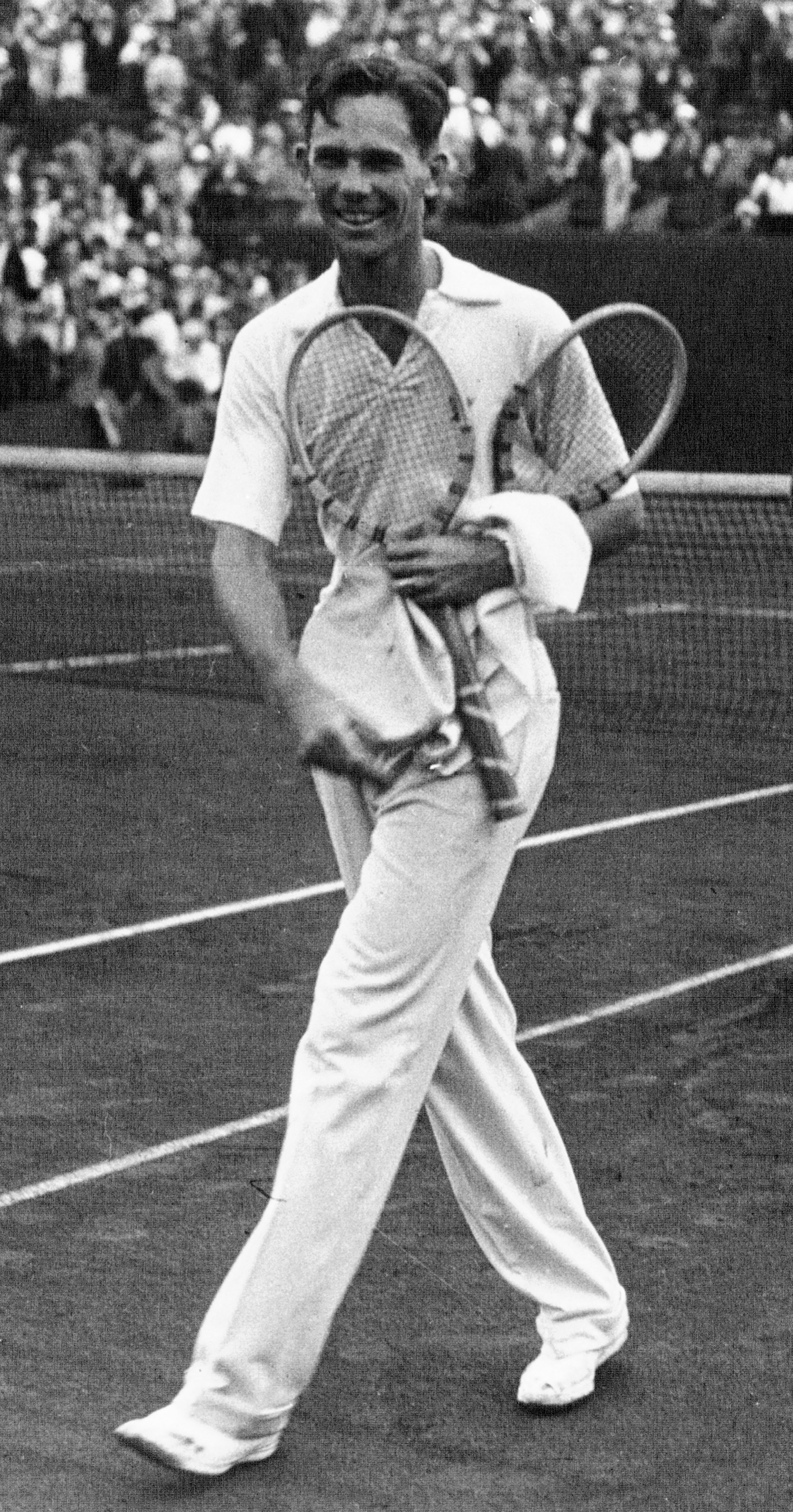
Ellsworth Vines

- Byron Black – tennis champion
- Daniel Cukierman (born 1995) – Israeli tennis player
- Tom Edlefsen – tennis champion
- Bob Falkenburg – tennis champion
- Amanda Fink (born 1986) – tennis player
- Luke Jensen – tennis champion
- Murphy Jensen – tennis champion
- Rick Leach – tennis champion
- Bob Lutz – tennis champion
- Gene Mako – tennis champion
- Bruce Manson – tennis player
- Stacy Margolin – tennis player
- Alex Olmedo (B.S. B.A.) – tennis champion
- Rafael Osuna – tennis champion
- Dennis Ralston – tennis champion
- Raúl Ramírez – tennis champion
- Ted Schroeder – tennis champion
- Stan Smith – tennis champion
- Brian Teacher (born 1954) – tennis player, Australian Open singles champion
- George Toley (B.A. 1942) – tennis coach and player
- Ellsworth Vines – tennis champion

=== Olympians ===
- Ed Ablowich – Olympic champion, track & field
- Rink Babka – Olympic silver medalist, discus throw; former world record holder
- Ronald Barak ('64) – Olympic gymnast
- Arthur Barnard – Olympic bronze medalist, track & field
- Lee Barnes – Olympic champion, track & field
- Lindsay Benko – Olympic champion, swimming
- Bob Bennett – Olympic bronze medalist, swimming
- Kim Black – Olympic champion, swimming
- Charles Borah – Olympic champion, track & field
- Joe Bottom – Olympic silver medalist, swimming; International Hall of Famer
- Cliff Bourland – Olympic champion, 4 x 400 metres relay
- Emil Breitkreutz – USC's first Olympian (1904); bronze medalist, track & field
- Brad Bridgewater – Olympic champion, swimming
- Arto Bryggare – Olympic bronze medalist, track & field
- Marvin "Ace" Burns – two-time water polo Olympian, member of United States Water Polo Hall of Fame
- Tonie Campbell – Olympic bronze medalist, track & field
- Patty Cardenas – Olympic silver medalist, water polo
- Edward Carfagno (M.Arch. 1933) – Olympic fencer; winner of three Academy Awards
- Ken Carpenter – Olympic champion, discus throw
- Chris Cavanaugh – Olympic champion, swimming
- Rex Cawley – Olympic champion, track & field
- Wes Chowen – 2x Olympian, Pan American Games bronze medalist
- Micah Christenson – Olympic bronze medalist, volleyball
- Peter Clentzos (B.A. 1932, M.Ed. 1947) – Olympic pole vaulter
- Roy Cochran – Olympic champion, track & field
- Richard Connor – Olympic bronze medalist, diving
- Lillian Copeland (B.A. 1928, J.D. 1932) – Olympic champion, discus throw; set world records in discus, javelin, and shot put; first Trojan woman in Olympics
- Robin Corsiglia – Olympic bronze medalist, swimming
- James Corson – Olympic bronze medalist, discus
- Buster Crabbe (B.A. 1931) – Olympic champion, swimming; actor
- Bill Craig – Olympic champion, swimming
- Kami Craig – Olympic silver medalist, water polo
- Mark Crear – Olympic silver medalist, swimming
- Tasha Danvers – Olympic bronze medalist, track & field
- Jack Davis – Olympic silver medalist, track & field
- Nicole Davis – Olympic silver medalist, volleyball
- Andre De Grasse – Olympic gold and silver medalist, track & field.
- Foy Draper – Olympic champion, track & field
- Charles Dumas (B.A. 1961) – Olympic champion, high jump
- Dusty Dvorak – Olympic champion, volleyball
- Torri Edwards – two-time Olympian, track & field
- Janet Evans (B.A. 1994) – Olympic champion, swimming, inducted into the U.S. Olympic Hall of Fame in 2004
- Thomas Fahrner – Olympic silver medalist, swimming
- Allyson Felix – Olympic champion, track & field
- Conn Findlay – three-time Olympic medalist in rowing and sailing
- Jeff Float – Olympic champion, swimming
- Bruce Furniss (B.A. 1979) – 1976 double Olympic champion, swimming, 10X world record holder, USC Sports Hall of Fame 2001, ISHOF, 1987 & Orange County Sports HOF, 1984
- Steve Furniss (B.S. 1976) – two-time Olympian, swimming 1972 and 1976, bronze medalist
- Gabriel Gardner – Olympic champion, volleyball
- Brittany Hayes – Olympic silver medalist, water polo
- Katinka Hosszú – Olympic champion, swimming, world record holder in 100 m individual medley, 200 m individual medley, and 400 m individual medley
- Bud Houser – Olympic champion, track & field
- Bob Hughes – Olympic champion, swimming & water polo – world record holder in breast stroke
- Sim Iness – Olympic champion, track & field
- Larsen Jensen – Olympic bronze medalist, swimming
- Payton Jordan – captain of 1939 NCAA track & field championship team, member of 1939 Rose Bowl team, 1968 US Olympic track team head coach
- Klete Keller – Olympic champion, swimming
- Fred Kelly – Olympic champion, 110 meter hurdles
- Balazs Kiss – Olympic champion, hammer throw
- Lenny Krayzelburg (B.S.B.A. 1998) – Olympic champion, swimming
- J. W. Krumpholz – Olympic silver medalist, water polo
- Mike Larrabee – Olympic champion, track & field
- Sammy Lee (M.D. 1947) – diver, first Asian American man to win Olympic gold medal for United States, inducted into U.S. Olympic Hall of Fame in 1990
- Dallas Long – Olympic champion, track & field
- Helene Mayer (certificate in social work, 1933) – Olympic champion, fencing
- Duncan McNaughton (B.A. 1933, Ph.D. 1950) – Olympic champion, high jump
- Earle Meadows – Olympic champion, track & field
- Cliff Meidl – two-time Olympian, flat water sprint kayak; chosen as U.S. flag bearer for Opening Ceremonies in Sydney 2000
- Oussama Mellouli – Olympic champion, swimming
- Inger Miller – Olympic champion, track & field
- John Naber (B.A. 1977) – Olympic champion, swimming, inducted into the U.S. Olympic Hall of Fame in 1984
- Mike O'Brien – Olympic champion, swimming
- Parry O'Brien – Olympic champion, shot put, inducted into the U.S. Olympic Hall of Fame in 1984
- Rafael Osuna – gold medal (doubles) 1968 Olympics, inducted into the International Tennis Hall of Fame 1979
- Anne Ottenbrite – Olympic champion, swimming
- Charlie Paddock (B.A. 1922) – Olympic champion, track & field
- Mel Patton (B.A. 1949) – Olympic champion, track & field
- Pat Powers – All-American and NCAA men's volleyball champion; Olympic gold medalist; AVP Pro Beach Volleyball
- Don Quarrie – Olympic champion, track & field
- Alma Richards – Olympic champion, track & field
- Amy Rodriguez – Olympic champion, soccer
- Janice Romary – Olympic foilist, fencing (1948, 1952, 1956, 1960, 1964 and 1968)
- April Ross – Beach volleyball player, bronze and silver medals
- Murray Rose (B.A. 1962) – Olympic champion, swimming
- William Ross (B.A. 1955) – Olympian, water polo (1956)
- Félix Sánchez – Olympic champion, track & field
- Kaitlin Sandeno (B.A. 2005) – Olympic champion, swimming
- Roy Saari (B.A. 1967) – Olympic champion, swimming – world record holder in 1500 m freestyle
- Bob Seagren (B.A. 1968) – Olympic champion, pole vaulter
- Rebecca Soni – Olympic champion, swimming, world-record holder in 200 m breaststroke
- Earl Thomson – Olympic champion, track & field
- Wilbur Thompson – Olympic champion, track & field
- Steve Timmons – Olympic champion, volleyball
- Moriah van Norman – Olympic silver medalist, water polo
- Erik Vendt – Olympic champion, swimming
- Mark Warkentin – Olympic swimmer, four-time All-American
- Quincy Watts – Olympic champion, track & field
- Lauren Wenger – Olympic silver medalist, water polo
- Josh West (born 1977) – British-American Olympic medalist rower and Earth Sciences professor
- Angela Williams – Olympian, track & field
- Jesse Williams – Olympian, track & field
- Randy Williams – Olympic champion, track & field
- Wally Wolf (1930–1997) – swimmer, water polo player, and Olympic champion
- Frank Wykoff (B.A. 1932, M.A. 1936) – Olympic champion, track & field, inducted to U.S. Olympic Hall of Fame in 1984
- Louis Zamperini (B.S. 1940) – Olympic champion

=== Miscellaneous ===
- Bibiana Candelas – volleyball player
- Peter Daland – swimming coach
- Phil Hill – only American-born driver to win the Formula One driving championship
- Ivory (B.A. 1984) – professional wrestler for World Wrestling Entertainment; born Lisa Moretti
- Savannah Levin (born 1995) – soccer player
- Jess Mortensen – NCAA champion track athlete and coach
- Jack Nethercutt II (B.A 1958) – World Sportscar Championship racer
- Dave Salo – swimming coach
- Eve Torres – professional wrestler for World Wrestling Entertainment

== Business ==
- Jonathan Ahdout (B.S.) –actor
- Dan Bane (B.S. 1969) – chairman and CEO of Trader Joe's
- Tom Barrack (B.A. 1969) – CEO of Colony Capital
- Marc Benioff (B.S.B.A. 1986) – founder and CEO of Salesforce.com
- Douglas G. Bergeron (M.S. 1987) – CEO of VeriFone
- Robert D. Beyer (B.S. 1981) – former CEO of TCW Group
- Carson Block (1998) – investor, short-seller, and founder of Muddy Waters Research
- David Bohnett (B.S. 1978) – founder and former CEO of Geocities.com, founder of David Bohnett Foundation
- Elliott Broidy (B.S.), businessman and Republican fundraiser
- Jerry Buss (Ph.D. 1957) – owner of Los Angeles Lakers
- Henry Caruso (B.S.B.A.) – founder of Dollar Rent-A-Car
- Rick Caruso (B.S. 1980) – CEO of Caruso Affiliated
- Alan Casden (B.S. 1968) – chairman and CEO of Casden Properties
- Ronnie Chan (陳啟宗) (M.B.A. 1976) – chairman of Hang Lung Group
- Fu Chengyu (傅成玉) (M.E.) – chairman of Sinopec; former CEO of China National Offshore Oil Corporation (2003–2011)
- Yang Ho Cho (M.B.A. 1979) – president and CEO of Korean Airlines
- Chung Mong-won (M.B.A. 1982) – CEO of Halla Group and Mando Corporation
- Dick Cook (B.A. 1972) – chairman of the Walt Disney Studios
- Scott Cook (B.A. 1974) – co-founder and chairman of Intuit, Inc.
- Kenneth C. Dahlberg (M.S.E.E. 1969) – president and CEO of Science Applications International Corporation
- Mandana Dayani (born 1982)–Iranian-American businesswoman and media executive
- Chris DeWolfe (M.B.A. 1997) – co-founder of MySpace and current CEO
- Sanford Diller – real estate developer
- David H. Dornsife – chairman of the Herrick Corporation, USC trustee, namesake of the College of Letters, Arts and Sciences
- Seymour Durst ('35), real estate investor and developer
- Vic Edelbrock Jr. (B.S. B.A. 1959) – president and CEO of Edelbrock Automotive
- Pierre El Daher – chairman and CEO of LBC and PAC Ltd.
- Douglas Emhoff (J.D. 1990) – entertainment lawyer, Second Gentleman of the United States
- Dick Enthoven – South African-born businessman, owner of Nando's
- Larry Flax (J.D. 1971) – co-founder of California Pizza Kitchen
- Robert M. Fomon – chairman and CEO of E. F. Hutton & Co.
- Carlo Gancia (M.A. in economics) – co-owner of the Forti Formula One team
- Maruta Gardner (Ph.D. 1988) – educator, community activist
- Abe Garver – investment banker
- Ivan Glasenberg (M.B.A. 1993) – CEO of Glencore, #96 richest man in the world
- Stanley Gold (J.D. 1967) – president and CEO of Shamrock Holdings
- Steve Goodall (B.S., M.B.A.) – president of J. D. Power and Associates
- Frances Hashimoto (1966) – former CEO of Mikawaya, inventor of mochi ice cream
- Jerry Heller (B.S.B.A. 1963) – co-founder and CEO of Ruthless Records
- Thomas Hicks (M.B.A 1970) – partner at Hicks, Muse, Tate & Furst; part-owner of Dallas Stars and Texas Rangers
- Barron Hilton (1946) – co-chairman of the Hilton Hotels chain, and the original owner of the San Diego Chargers
- Daisy Ho (何超鳳) (B.A.) – chairman of SJM Holdings and executive director of Shun Tak Holdings
- David T. Hon (Ph.D. 1971) – physicist and founder of Dahon folding bicycles
- Ming Hsieh (B.S.E.E. 1983, M.S.E.E. 1984) – president and founder of Cogent Systems
- Bradley Wayne Hughes (B.S.B.A. 1957) – founder of Public Storage
- Jon Huntsman, Sr. (M.B.A.) – founder and chairman of Huntsman Corporation
- Hyekyung "Shelly" Hwang (M.B.A.) – founder of Pinkberry
- Ray R. Irani (Ph.D. 1957) – CEO of Occidental Petroleum
- James Jannard – founder of Oakley Sunglasses and Red Digital Cinema Camera Company
- Suzanne Nora Johnson (B.S. 1979) – vice chairman of Goldman Sachs
- Bruce Karatz (J.D. 1970) – chairman and CEO of KB Home
- Sabrina Kay (MBA, 2005) – founder and Chancellor of Fremont College and Fremont Private Investments
- Kyle Kazan (B.A. 1990) – co-founder of Beach Front Properties, LLC. and Beach Front Property Management, Inc.
- Richard Knerr (B.S.) – co-founder of Wham-O, creators of the Hula Hoop, Frisbee, and Superball
- Ronald Lam (M.B.A. 1986) – former CEO/president of GameWorks
- Terrence Lanni (B.S. 1965) – former chairman and CEO of MGM Mirage
- Aaron Levie (Leave of absence, 2005) – CEO of Box
- Alan Levine (B.S. 1968, J.D. 1971) – former president and COO of Sony Pictures Entertainment
- Jack Lindquist (B.A. 1950) – former president of Disneyland
- Bryan Lourd (B.A. 1982) – co-chairman of Creative Artists Agency (CAA)
- Rebecca Ma (B.S.) – Founder of Stupidpals and founder of Hearth Wireless Chargers, social media influencer, socialite
- Rao Machiraju (Ed.D. 1984) EIR at USC
- Armen Margarian (B.S. 2001, M.B.A. 2006) – publisher, co-founder of NexusLab Inc.
- Mike Markkula (B.S.E.E., M.S.E.E.) – former CEO and angel investor of Apple Computer, Inc.
- Preston Martin (B.S. 1947, M.B.A. 1948) – founder of the PMI Mortgage Insurance Company; former vice chairman of the Federal Reserve Board
- Steve McIntosh (B.S. 1984) – founder and president of Now & Zen, Inc.; influential writer in the field of integral theory
- Arthur Melin (B.S.) – co-founder of Wham-O
- Adam Milstein (M.B.A. 1983) – real estate investor and philanthropist
- Oscar Munoz (B.S. 1982) – former president and CEO of United Airlines
- Brian Mulligan – former chairman of Fox Television
- Sam Nazarian – businessman, investor, and philanthropist.
- Paul Orfalea – founder of Kinko's
- Sol Price (J.D. 1957) – founder of Price Club (now Costco)
- Charles Prince (B.A. 1971, M.A. 1975, J.D. 1975) – former chairman and CEO of Citigroup
- Sean Rad – founder of Tinder.
- Edward C. Raymund – founder of Tech Data Corp.
- Jim Rogers (L.L.M. 1963) – chairman and CEO of Sunbelt Communications
- Edward P. Roski (B.S. 1962) – chairman and CEO of Majestic Realty Co., part owner of the Los Angeles Kings and Los Angeles Lakers
- Steve Saleen – CEO and founder of Saleen Performance, Inc.
- Devita Saraf – founder of Vu Technologies and co-founder of Vu TelePresence
- Robert Sarzo (B.S. 2004) – owner of Sarzo Entertainment LLC
- Alan Smolinisky (B.S. 2001) – entrepreneur, real estate investor, owner of the Los Angeles Dodgers and the Palisadian-Post newspaper
- Jeff Smulyan (B.S. 1969, J.D. 1972) – founder and CEO of Emmis Communications
- Edwin Soeryadjaya – Indonesian businessman, co-founder of Adaro Energy
- Mark Stevens (B.S.E.E. 1981, B.A.ECON 1981, M.S.CENG 1984) – partner at Sequoia Capital
- Brian Teacher (born 1954; M.B.A.) – world #7 tennis player
- Michael Trope – sports agent, divorce lawyer
- Kevin Tsujihara (B.S. 1986) – former CEO of Warner Bros. Pictures
- Ronald Tutor (B.S.B.A. 1963) – president and CEO of Tutor-Saliba Corp.
- Joe Ucuzoglu (B.S.) – global CEO of Deloitte
- Andrew Viterbi (Ph.D. 1962) – co-founder of Qualcomm
- William Wang (B.S. 1986) – founder and CEO of Vizio
- Tom Warren (B.S.) – Ironman champion, triathlete, business owner
- Blair Westlake – former corporate vice president of media and entertainment at Microsoft
- Craig Winn (B.S. 1977) – founder of Value America; author of Prophet of Doom and Tea With Terrorists
- Albert C. Zapanta – president and CEO of the United States-Mexico Chamber of Commerce

== Performing arts ==
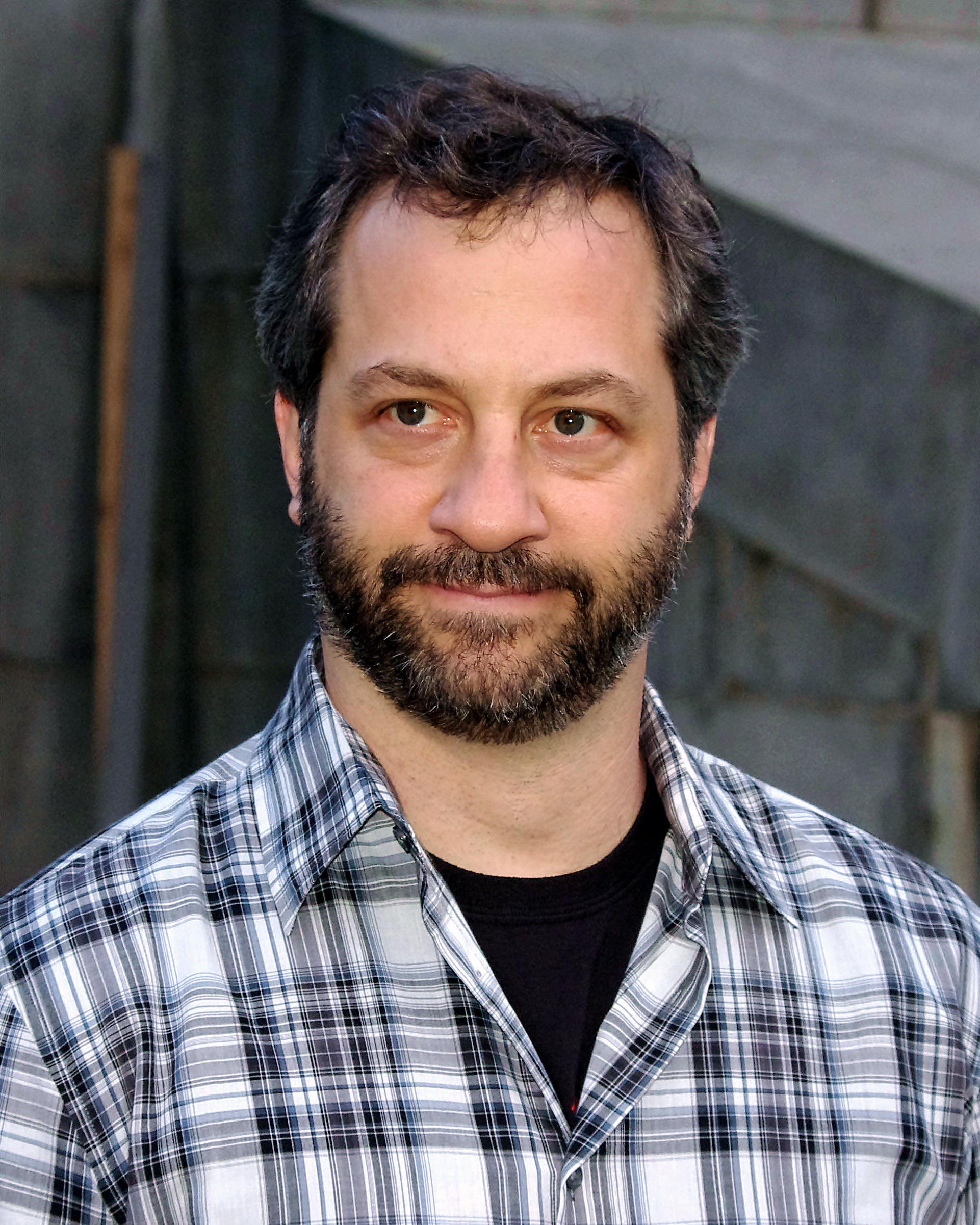
Judd Apatow

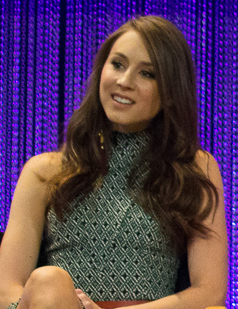
Troian Bellisario

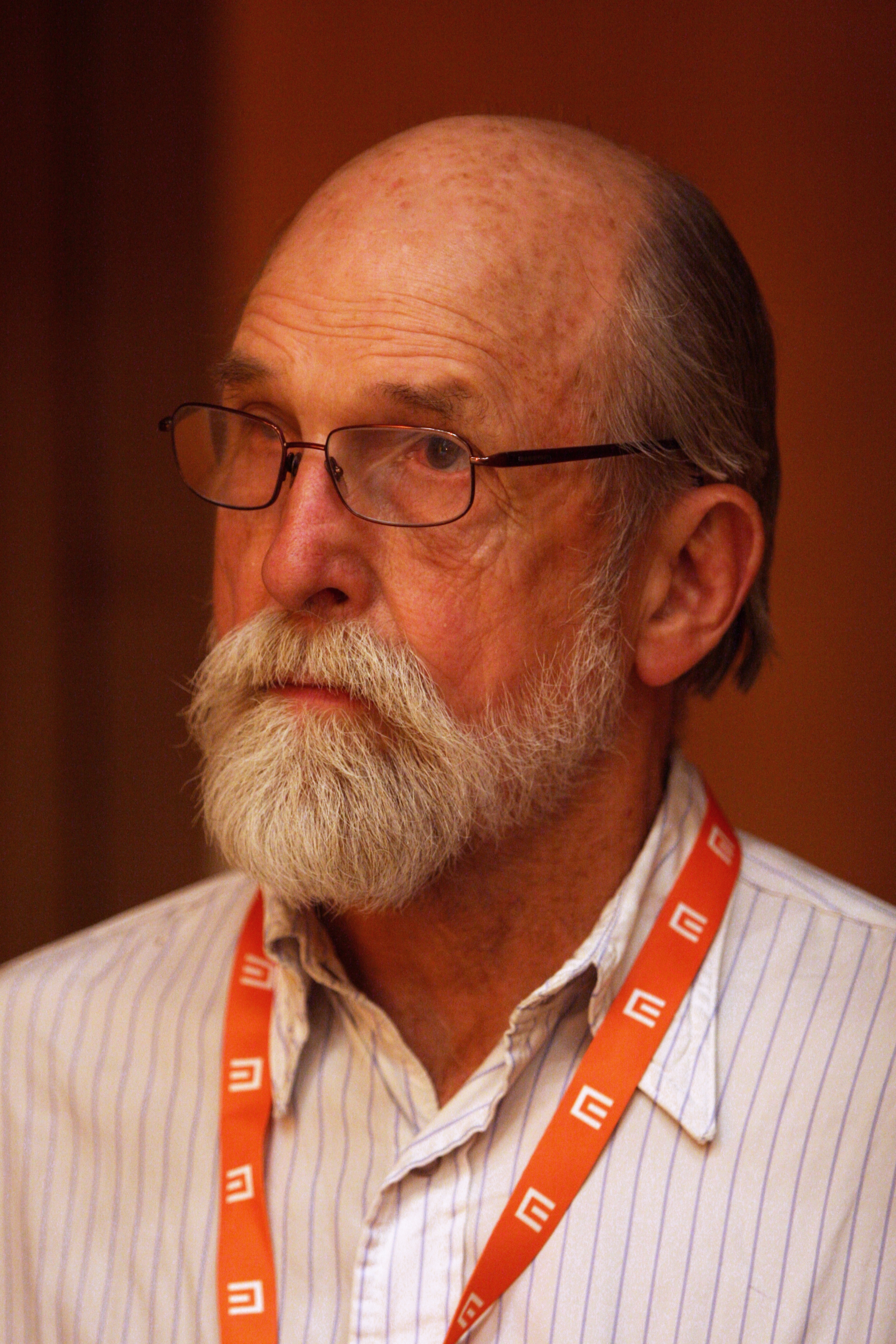
Les Blank

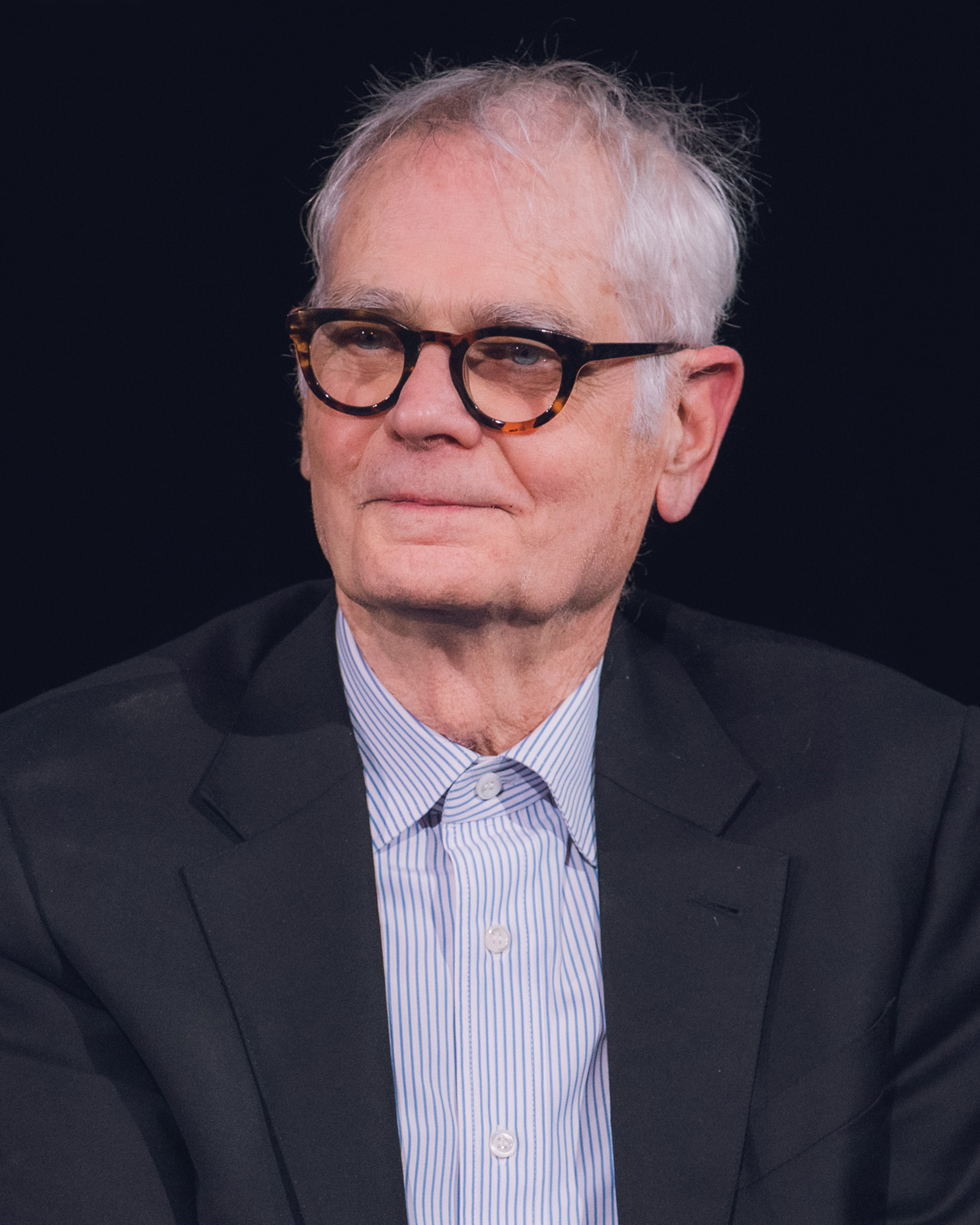
Caleb Deschanel

Susan Downey

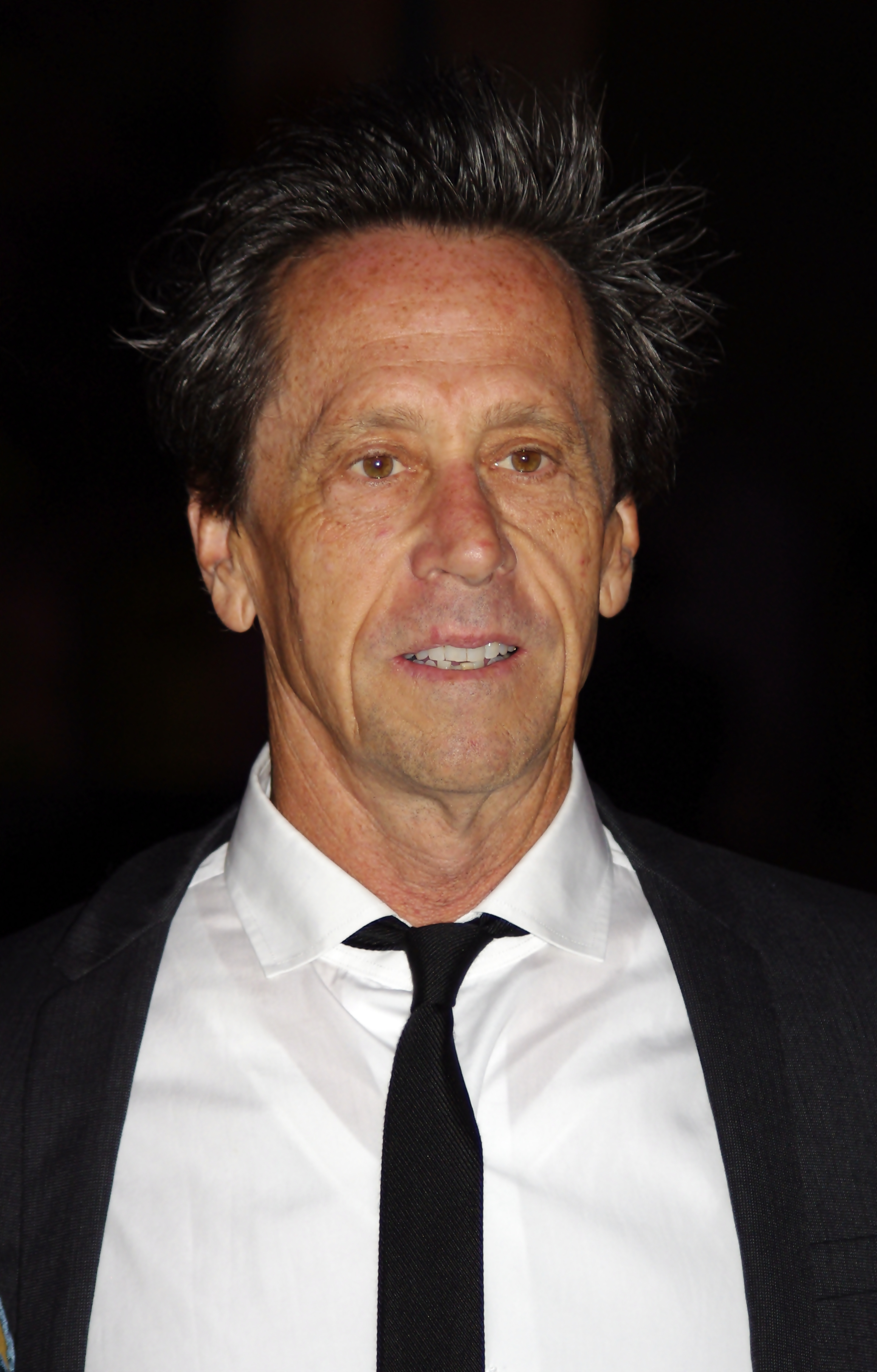
Brian Grazer

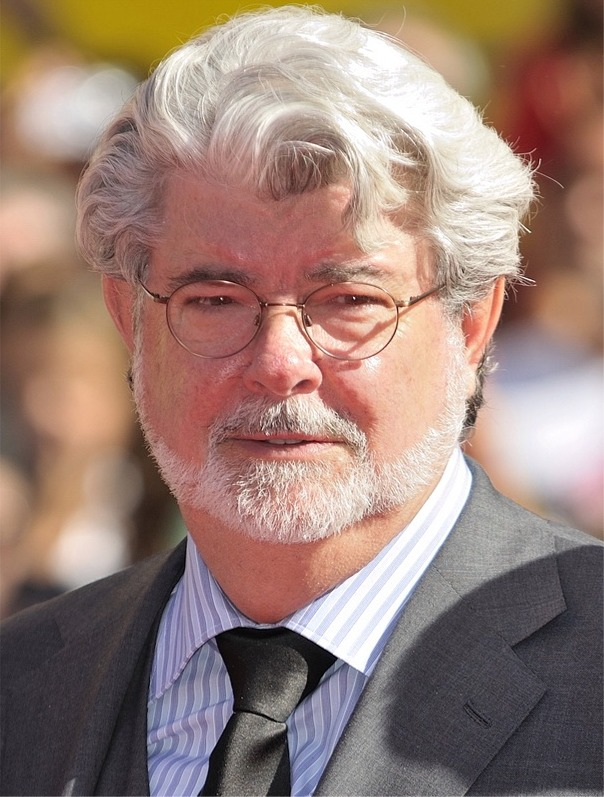
George Lucas

=== Directing, producing and editing ===
- Elizabeth Allen – director
- Thom Andersen – film critic
- David Anspaugh – director
- Judd Apatow – filmmaker
- Gregg Araki – filmmaker
- John August – filmmaker
- John Bailey – cinematographer
- Walt Becker – filmmaker
- Jack Bender – executive producer of Lost
- Deven Bhojani – actor and director
- Laura Bialis – filmmaker
- Les Blank – documentary filmmaker
- Jeffrey Blitz – filmmaker
- Paul Harris Boardman – producer and screenwriter
- Stephen Book - director, actor
- Robert F. Boyle – art director and production designer
- Charles Braverman – filmmaker
- Henry Bumstead – art director and production designer
- Bryan Burk – executive producer of Lost
- Keith Calder – producer
- Trey Callaway – screenwriter and producer
- John Carpenter – film director
- Aneesh Chaganty – director
- Sharon Choi – interpreter, director, and screenwriter
- Adam Christian Clark – filmmaker
- John M. Chu – filmmaker
- Ryan Coogler – filmmaker
- Sandro Corsaro – executive producer, creator of Kick Buttowski: Suburban Daredevil
- Sean Covel – producer
- R. J. Cutler (B.A. 1993) – filmmaker
- Thomas Del Ruth – cinematographer
- Scott Derrickson – filmmaker
- Caleb Deschanel – cinematographer
- Dean Devlin – screenwriter and producer
- Anthony DiMaria – actor, director, producer
- Hwang Dong-hyuk – South Korean director and screenwriter
- Susan Downey – producer
- Ellis R. Dungan – director
- Robert Elswit – cinematographer
- Bahman Farmanara – director and producer
- Rick Famuyiwa – director
- Kevin Feige – producer and head of Marvel Studios
- Verna Fields – film editor and sound editor
- Erik Fleming – film director and producer
- Dana Fox – screenwriter
- William A. Fraker – cinematographer
- Joe Francis – adult film producer
- Richard Franklin – Australian film director
- David S. Goyer – filmmaker
- James Gray – film director and screenwriter
- Brian Grazer – film and television producer
- Taylor Hackford – film director and producer
- Conrad Hall – cinematographer
- Curtis Harrington – experimental filmmaker
- Chris Tsui Hesse – Ghanaian cinematographer, filmmaker, film administrator, photographer and Presbyterian minister
- Ami Horowitz – filmmaker, media personality
- Ron Howard – film director and actor
- George Huang – filmmaker
- Martin Hynes – filmmaker
- Robert Illes – Emmy-winning TV writer
- James Ivory – film director
- Frederick Johnson – Emmy-winning TV writer
- Rian Johnson – filmmaker
- Joe Johnston – film director
- Scott Alexander and Larry Karaszewski – writers
- Howard G. Kazanjian – film producer
- Richard Kelly – filmmaker
- Irvin Kershner – film director
- Karey Kirkpatrick – screenwriter
- Randal Kleiser – filmmaker
- Sasha Knezev – filmmaker
- John Knoll (B.A. 1984) – motion picture visual effects specialist, co-creator of Adobe Photoshop
- Kurt Kuenne – filmmaker, known for the documentary Dear Zachary
- Chad Kultgen – writer, producer
- Gary Kurtz – film producer
- Valerie LaPointe – film director and storyboard artist
- Frederick Larson – law professor and filmmaker
- Barry Levy – screenwriter
- John Longenecker – film director, cinematographer
- Robert Lovenheim – film producer and writer
- Doug Liman – film director and producer
- George Lucas – film director and producer
- Joseph Magee (M.L.A. 1984) – music scoring mixer
- Felipe Marino – producer
- Gregory Markopoulos – filmmaker
- Les Mayfield – producer and director
- Stuart McClave – filmmaker
- Kerry McCluggage – film and TV executive and producer
- David Milhous – Emmy-winning film and TV editor
- John Milius – film director and screenwriter
- Miles Millar – screenwriter and producer
- Herman Miller – writer and producer
- Ron W. Miller – CEO and president of Walt Disney Productions
- Walter Murch – film editor and sound designer
- Don Murphy – producer
- Gustin Nash – screenwriter
- Tom Neff – film director, producer and executive
- Joe Neurauter – producer
- Michael Nolin – producer
- Tom Oesch – director
- Tommy O'Haver – filmmaker
- Richard Outten – screenwriter
- Sam Peckinpah – film director
- Brian Wayne Peterson – screenwriter and television producer
- Jason Peterson – producer, CEO, digital distribution entrepreneur
- Angelo Pizzo – screenwriter and producer
- Gene Polito – cinematographer and professor at USC School of Cinematic Arts
- Patrik-Ian Polk – film director and producer
- Jon Poll – film editor and director
- Jon Paul Puno – film director
- Jason Reitman – film director
- Shonda Rhimes – screenwriter, director, and producer
- Jay Roach – film director and producer
- Robert Rodat – screenwriter
- Gene Roddenberry – screenwriter and producer
- Barry Rubinow – film executive and editor
- Jason Russell – film director, co-founder of Invisible Children, Inc.
- Gary Rydstrom (B.A. 1981) – sound designer
- Walter Salles – filmmaker
- Asrul Sani – Indonesian film director and writer
- Jarrett Schaefer – filmmaker
- Elle Schneider – cinematographer, developer of Digital Bolex camera
- Josh Schwartz – producer and creator of The O.C.
- John Schwartzman – cinematographer
- Ben Shedd – documentary filmmaker
- Sigurjón Sighvatsson – producer
- Bryan Singer – film director
- John Singleton – film director
- Stephen Sommers – film director
- Dror Soref – filmmaker
- Scott Speer – music video producer
- Adam Stein – filmmaker, editor
- Tim Story – film director
- Benj Thall– director, film editor, and former child actor
- Dalton Trumbo – screenwriter
- Ron Underwood – film director
- Anthony B. Unger – producer
- Lee Unkrich – film director
- Clay Walker – film producer, director, cinematographer and editor
- Sean Wang – director
- Matt Reeves – director
- Tommy Walker – events director
- Matthew Weiner – writer, director, producer, creator of Mad Men
- David N. Weiss – screenwriter
- Jim Whitaker – producer and Peabody Award-winning documentary filmmaker
- Max Winkler – director, screenwriter
- Alexander Winn – filmmaker
- David L. Wolper (B.A. 1949) – film and television producer
- Freddie Wong – YouTube celebrity and director
- Marianna Yarovskaya – documentary filmmaker
- Robert Yeoman – cinematographer
- Robert Zemeckis – Academy Award-winning director
- Laura Ziskin – producer
- Eric Zumbrunnen – editor
- Doe Mayer-filmmaker, Mary Pickford Chair in Film and Television Production as well as Professor Emerita of Cinematic Arts.

=== Acting ===
- Patrick J. Adams – actor best known for TV series Suits
- Sasha Alexander – actress best known as Maura Isles on Rizzoli & Isles
- Zeenat Aman – Indian actress, model and Miss Asia Pacific 1970
- Morris Ankrum – actor
- June Bacon-Bercey (MPA 1979) – television meteorologist, first African American and first woman to be awarded American Meteorological Society's Seal of Approval
- Robin Bain – actress, writer, director
- Brandon Barash – actor
- Hugh Beaumont – actor, television director, and Methodist minister
- Kathryn Beaumont (1938) – singer, voice actress and schoolteacher
- Beck Bennett – Saturday Night Live cast member, actor and comedian
- Troian Bellisario – actress
- John Beradino – baseball player and actor, General Hospital
- Julie Marie Berman – actress best known as Lulu Spencer on General Hospital
- Richard Biggs – actor
- Harry Blackstone Jr. – actor and magician
- Nichole Bloom – actress
- Ward Bond – football player and actor
- LeVar Burton – actor
- Sophia Bush – actress
- Andrés Cantor – sportscaster
- Rosalind Chao – actress
- Eric Close – actor
- Lily Collins – actress
- Miranda Cosgrove – actress and singer
- Buster Crabbe (B.A. 1931) – actor, All-American swimmer at USC
- Lorinne Crawford, actress and dancer
- James Dannaldson – actor, animal handler
- Erica Dasher – actress
- Dix Davis – actor
- Jenna Dewan – actress and dancer
- Ree Drummond (1991 B.A. Gerontology) – chef, blogger, businesswoman and television personality
- Anthony Edwards – film and television actor
- Luke Eisner – actor, singer, songwriter
- Lindsay Ellis – youtuber, author
- Rob Estes – actor
- Dorothy Fay – actress
- Jere Fields – former actress and child star
- Will Ferrell (B.A., 1990) – actor and comedian; awarded honorary doctorate in 2017
- America Ferrera – actress
- Joe Flynn – actor
- Dave Franco – actor
- Jimmy Fowlie – actor
- Vova Galchenko – juggler
- David Gallagher – actor
- Ron Gans – character actor and voice actor
- Lauren German – actress
- Sarah Gilman – actress
- Skyler Gisondo – actor
- Renée Elise Goldsberry – Tony-winning actress
- Gage Golightly - actress
- Elise Golgowski – actress, playwright, and film maker
- Topher Grace – actor
- Greer Grammer – actress
- Kevin Hagen – actor
- Kristin Hanggi – Tony Award-nominated theatre director
- Daryl Hannah – actress
- Larry Harmon – actor, known as Bozo the Clown
- Jenilee Harrison – actress
- Evan Helmuth (1999) – actor
- Mike Henry – actor, also played football at USC and in NFL
- James Hong – actor
- Patty Hou – TV host, actress, newscaster
- Ron Howard – actor, director, producer
- Grant Imahara – TV personality
- O'Shea Jackson Jr. – actor, rapper
- David Jaffe – video game designer
- Brad Johnson – actor
- Rob Kardashian – TV personality and businessman
- JP Karliak – actor, voice actor and comedian
- Mahira Khan – actress
- Rachna Khatau – actress, writer and singer
- Regina King – Academy Award-winning actress
- Ben Kurland – actor, producer
- Swoosie Kurtz – actress
- Raymond Lam – actor at Hong Kong top TV station TVB (Television Broadcasts Limited) (attended USC for one year)
- Michael Landon – actor
- Joey Lawrence – actor
- Matthew Lawrence – actor
- Charlotte Laws – TV host, actress, author
- Nelson Leigh – actor
- James Lesure – actor
- Jeff Lewis – star of Flipping Out
- Jaren Lewison – actor
- Lisa Ling – former co-host of The View
- Chris Lowell – actor
- Alexander Ludwig – actor
- Joseph Mazzello – actor
- Michael McDonald – actor and comedian
- Ted McGinley – actor
- Bridgit Mendler – singer-songwriter and actress
- Jeremy Miller – actor
- Derek Mio – actor
- Bentley Mitchum – actor, grandson of Robert Mitchum
- Kyle Mooney – Saturday Night Live cast member, actor, comedian
- Senta Moses – actress
- Natalie Nunn – reality television star
- Timothy Olyphant (B.A., 1990) – actor and producer; also swam competitively for USC
- Timothy Omundson – actor
- Fess Parker – screen and television actor
- Kelly Preston – actress
- Claudia Previn (B.A., 1977) – actress, singer, graphic artist, editor
- Ke Huy Quan – Academy Award-winning actor
- Maeve Quinlan – actress
- Michael Pataki – actor
- Paula Patton – actress
- Bradley Steven Perry -actor
- Drew Pinsky – physician, radio and TV personality
- Vaneza Leza Pitynski – actress
- Whitney Port – cast member on MTV's reality show The Hills, fashion designer
- Kelly Preston – actress
- Nathalia Ramos – actress
- Storm Reid – actress
- J. August Richards – actor
- John Ritter – actor
- David A. Romero – spoken-word poet
- Jon Rudnitsky – actor, comedian
- Emily Rutherfurd – actress
- Mort Sahl – comedian
- Stark Sands – actor
- Kyra Sedgwick – actress
- Tom Selleck – actor
- Ally Sheedy – actress
- Cybill Shepherd – actress
- Chima Simone – actress, TV personality
- Karan Soni – actor, best known from the Deadpool movies
- Robert Stack – actor
- Eric Stoltz – actor
- Madeleine Stowe – actress
- Cary-Hiroyuki Tagawa – actor
- Ganta Ravi Teja – actor
- Marlo Thomas – actress
- Ross Thomas – actor, filmmaker
- Eve Torres – wrestler, dancer, and model
- Robert Vaughn – actor
- Natasha Gregson Wagner – actress
- John Wayne – actor (did not graduate), played football while attending
- Forest Whitaker (B.A. 1982) – Academy Award-winning actor
- Mary Kate Wiles – actress
- Brad Williams – comedian
- Deborah Ann Woll – actress, best known as Jessica on True Blood
- Anton Yelchin – actor
- Lee Thompson Young – actor, best known as Detective Barry Frost on Rizzoli & Isles

=== Music ===
- 24kGoldn – rapper, singer, and songwriter
- Ambrose Akinmusire (M.M. 2007) – jazz trumpeter
- Herb Alpert (B.M. 1954) – musician, co-founder of A&M Records
- BANKS – alternative/R&B singer
- Annie Mottram Craig Batten (1883 1964) – singer, vocal instructor, and composer
- Christophe Beck (graduate certificate in Scoring for Motion Pictures and Television, 1993) – film score composer
- Marco Beltrami (graduate certificate in Scoring for Motion Pictures and Television, 1993) – film score composer
- Aloe Blacc – soul singer, musician
- Harold Budd (B.M. 1966) – ambient/avant-garde composer
- Todd Carey – singer-songwriter and musician
- Rob Cavallo (B.A., English 1985) – Grammy Award-winning record producer and A&R; Chief Creative Officer of Warner Music Group
- Alan Chang (B.M. 2002) – musician, composer, musical director for Michael Bublé
- Nicolas Chumachenco – violinist
- Rozzi Crane (B.M. Popular Music Performance) – singer-songwriter
- Alfred Darlington, better known as Daedelus, electronic music producer based in Los Angeles
- John Dearman (B.M. 1981, M.M. 1983) – classical guitarist
- Felly (2017) – rapper
- Flea – bassist for the Red Hot Chili Peppers
- Nmon Ford (B.M., M.M.) – Grammy Award-winning singer
- Andy Garfield (B.A.) – film score composer
- Goldroom – musician
- Jerry Goldsmith – film score composer
- Ludwig Göransson – film score composer
- Kina Grannis – musician
- Macy Gray (B.A., screenwriting 1990) – Grammy Award-winning singer-songwriter
- Gryffin (B.S. 2009) – electronic music producer
- Lionel Hampton – jazz musician
- Dexter Holland – singer and guitarist for The Offspring
- Marilyn Horne (B.M. 1953) – opera singer
- James Horner (B.M. 1974) – film score composer
- James Newton Howard – film score composer
- Scott Hoying – singer, baritone from Pentatonix
- Izza – singer, rapper
- Paul Jackson Jr. (B.M.) – guitarist
- JGivens (B.S., Mechanical Engineering 2010) – rap artist with record label Humble Beast; born Jeremiah Givens
- Tommy Johnson (B.M. 1956) – tuba player
- William Kanengiser (B.M. 1981, M.M. 1983) – classical guitarist
- Thomas Kotcheff (M.M. 2012, D.M.A. 2019) – composer
- Morten Lauridsen (B.M. 1966, M.A. 1968, D.M.A. 1974) – composer
- Charles Lloyd
- Harry Mack – freestyle rapper
- Roger Joseph Manning Jr. – keyboardist for Jellyfish, Beck and The Moog Cookbook
- Anthony Marinelli – film score composer
- Robert Marsteller – faculty, principal trombone, Los Angeles Philharmonic (1946–1971)
- Bear McCreary – film score composer
- Mark McGrath – singer, frontman of Sugar Ray, host of Extra
- Angela Meade (M.M. 2004) – opera singer
- David Newman (M.M. 1982) – film composer
- Kelley O'Connor (B.M. 2002) – opera singer
- Martin O'Donnell – composer best known for video game work
- John Ottman (B.A. 1988) – film score composer
- Christopher Parkening (B.M. 1969) – classical guitarist
- Ashan Pillai – violist
- Elizabeth Pitcairn – concert violinist
- Basil Poledouris – film score composer
- Brian Ralston – film score composer
- Lee Ritenour (B.M. 1972) – jazz guitarist
- Jessica Rivera (M.M. 1998) – opera singer
- Douglas Romayne (graduate certificate in Scoring for Motion Pictures and Television, 2000) – television and film score composer
- Patrice Rushen (B.M. 1976) – songwriter, session musician, producer, arranger, film composer, and musical director
- Roena Muckelroy Savage (1927) – concert soprano, choir director, professor of voice at Lincoln University (Missouri)
- Saweetie – rapper
- Craig Saper – audio engineer, actor
- Elise Solberg – pianist, composer, and songwriter
- Daniel Slatkin – film score composer
- Carly Rose Sonenclar (B.S. 2021) –singer-songwriter, and runner-up of the second season of The X Factor
- Anil Srinivasan – classical pianist and music educator
- Scott Tennant (B.M. 1986) – classical guitarist
- Salli Terri – singer and songwriter
- Thes One – rapper, producer
- Michael Tilson Thomas (B.M. 1967, M.M. 1976) – conductor and music director of the San Francisco Symphony Orchestra
- Robyn Troup – singer, "My Grammy Moment 2007" winner
- Bertha Weber – composer
- Mack Wilberg – director of the Mormon Tabernacle Choir
- Frank Wildhorn – Broadway composer
- Austin Wintory – Grammy-nominated composer for video games and film
- Andrew York (M.M. 1986) – classical guitarist-composer
- Young MC – rapper, producer and writer
- Steven Zhu (more popularly known as Zhu) – electronic music producer
- Magnus Ferrell - singer, songwriter

== Politics and government ==
=== Presidents and prime ministers ===
- Marouf al-Bakhit (M.P.A. 1982) – 36th prime minister of Jordan
- Fayez Al-Tarawneh (M.S 1974, Ph.D. 1980) – 31st prime minister of Jordan
- Zulfikar Ali Bhutto (attended the College 1947–49) – first democratically elected prime minister and president of Pakistan
- Abdurrahim El-Keib (M.S.E.E. 1976) – interim prime minister of Libya
- Ljupčo Jordanovski (Ph.D. 1985) – former acting president of the Republic of Macedonia, speaker of the Macedonian Parliament, and Macedonian ambassador to the U.S.
- Takeo Miki (attended the college in the 1930s) – 41st prime minister of Japan
- Mohamed Morsi (Ph.D. Electrical Engineering 1982) – 5th president of Egypt
- Shinzō Abe (Class of 1979) – 90th and 96th prime minister of Japan
- Kang Young-Hoon (M.A. 1966, Ph.D. 1973) – 21st prime minister of the Republic of Korea (South Korea)

=== Cabinet ministers and secretaries ===
- Ghazi Algosaibi (M.A. 1964) – Saudi Arabian statesman, former minister (five portfolios), former ambassador to Bahrain and the UK
- Rafic Chahine (PhD) – Lebanese minister of planning, 1960–1961; minister of labor and social affairs, 1968
- Warren Christopher (B.A. 1945) – 63rd United States secretary of state
- Michael B. Donley (B.A. 1977, M.A. 1978) – 22nd United States Secretary of the Air Force
- Robert Finch (LL.B. 1951) – 8th United States Secretary of Health, Education, and Welfare, 38th lieutenant governor of California
- Vecdi Gönül (M.P.A. 1970) – 62nd minister of defense of Turkey and member of parliament for Kocaeli
- Juan José Guerra Abud (M.S.) – Secretary of Environment and Natural Resources of Mexico (2012–2015) and ambassador to Italy, Albania, Malta, and San Marino
- Paul Robert Ignatius (B.A. 1942) – United States Secretary of the Navy, 1967–1969
- Hilda Solis (M.P.A. 1981) – 25th United States Secretary of Labor
- Kantathi Suphamongkhon (Ph.D. 1984) – 39th foreign minister of Thailand, UC Regent's Professor at UCLA, 2007–2009
- Robert O. Work (M.S.) – 32nd United States deputy secretary of defense

=== Governors ===
- Jim Gibbons (attended graduate school in the 1980s) – 28th governor of Nevada
- Fred Hall (B.A. 1938, LL.B. 1941) – 33rd governor of Kansas
- Tomás Yarrington (M.P.A. 1986) – former governor of Tamaulipas, Mexico

=== United States senators ===
- Dean Heller (B.S. 1985) – former United States senator from Nevada
- Thomas H. Kuchel (B.A. 1932, LL.B. 1935) – former U.S. senator from California
- Jim Webb (attended the college 1963–1964) – U.S. senator from Virginia

=== United States representatives ===
- Bob Barr (B.A. 1970) – former member of the United States House of Representatives; Libertarian Party nominee for president of the United States (2008)
- Nanette Barragán (J.D. 2005) – member of the United States House of Representatives
- Karen Bass (M.S.W. 2015) – member of the United States House of Representatives
- Henry S. Benedict (LL.B. 1910) – former member of the United States House of Representatives
- Mary Bono (B.A. 1984) – member of the United States House of Representatives
- Yvonne Brathwaite Burke (J.D. 1956) – former Los Angeles County Supervisor; former member of the United States House of Representatives
- Carolyn Bourdeaux (M.P.A. 1999) – member of the United States House of Representatives
- Phillip Burton (B.A. 1947) – former member of the United States House of Representatives
- John Campbell (M.S.B.T. 1977) – member of the United States House of Representatives
- Wes Cooley (B.S. 1958) – former member of the United States House of Representatives
- James C. Corman (J.D. 1948) – former member of the United States House of Representatives
- Christopher Cox (B.A. 1973) – former chairman of the U.S. Securities and Exchange Commission; former member of the United States House of Representatives
- Henry Aldous Dixon (Ed.D. 1937) – former member of the United States House of Representatives
- Charles Djou (J.D. 1996) – former member of the United States House of Representatives
- John F. Dockweiler (LL.B. 1921) – former member of the United States House of Representatives
- Clyde Doyle (LL.B. 1917) – former member of the United States House of Representatives
- Bertrand W. Gearhart (LL.B. 1914) – former member of the United States House of Representatives
- Augustus F. Hawkins (M.A. 1932) – former member of the United States House of Representatives
- Patrick J. Hillings (B.A. 1947, J.D. 1949) – former member of the United States House of Representatives
- Andrew J. Hinshaw (B.A. 1950) – former member of the United States House of Representatives
- Ashley Hinson (B.A. 2004) – member of the United States House of Representatives
- Joseph F. Holt (B.S. 1947) – former member of the United States House of Representatives
- Craig Hosmer (J.D. 1940) – former member of the United States House of Representatives
- William W. Johnson (LL.B. 1925) – former member of the United States House of Representatives
- George A. Kasem (B.S. 1949, LL.B. 1951) – former member of the United States House of Representatives
- Jay Kim (B.S. 1967, M.S. 1969, M.S. 1970) – former member of the United States House of Representatives
- Young Kim (B.B.A. 1994) – member of the United States House of Representatives
- Glenard P. Lipscomb – former member of the United States House of Representatives
- James F. Lloyd (M.A. 1966) – former member of the United States House of Representatives
- Cynthia McKinney (B.A. 1978) – former member of the United States House of Representatives; Green Party nominee for president of the United States (2008)
- Ralph Metcalfe (M.A. 1939) – former member of the United States House of Representatives; Olympic champion in track & field
- Mariannette Miller-Meeks (M.S. 1980) – member of the United States House of Representatives
- Juanita Millender-McDonald (attended the college) – former member of the United States House of Representatives
- Carlos Moorhead (J.D. 1949) – former member of the United States House of Representatives
- Dana Rohrabacher (M.A. 1971) – member of the United States House of Representatives
- Byron N. Scott (M.A. 1930) – former member of the United States House of Representatives
- Keith Self (M.A. 1981) – member of the United States House of Representatives
- H. Allen Smith (A.B. 1930, LL.B. 1933) – former member of the United States House of Representatives
- Michelle Steel (M.B.A. 2010) – member of the United States House of Representatives
- William I. Traeger (LL.B. 1909) – former member of the United States House of Representatives; former Los Angeles County Sheriff; former USC Trojans football head coach
- Walter R. Tucker III (B.A. 1978) – former member of the United States House of Representatives
- Robert A. Underwood (Ed.D. 1987) – former delegate from Guam to the United States House of Representatives
- James B. Utt (J.D. 1946) – former member of the United States House of Representatives
- Lionel Van Deerlin (B.A. 1937) – former member of the United States House of Representatives
- Tom Vandergriff (B.A. 1947) – former member of the United States House of Representatives
- Charles E. Wiggins (B.S. 1953, LL.B. 1956) – former member of the United States House of Representatives

=== Jurists ===
==== U.S. Court of Appeals judges ====
- Arthur Alarcón (B.S. 1949, LL.B. 1951) – judge of the U.S. Ninth Circuit Court of Appeals (1979–1992)
- James Marshall Carter (J.D. 1927) – judge of the U.S. Ninth Circuit Court of Appeals (1967–1971); judge of the U.S. District Court for the Southern District of California (1949–1967)
- Walter Raleigh Ely Jr. (LL.M. 1949) – judge of the U.S. Ninth Circuit Court of Appeals (1964–1979)
- Warren J. Ferguson (LL.B. 1949) – judge of the U.S. Ninth Circuit Court of Appeals (1979–1986); judge of the U.S. District Court for the Central District of California (1966–1979)
- Ferdinand Francis Fernandez (B.S. 1958, J.D. 1962) – judge of the U.S. Ninth Circuit Court of Appeals (1989–2002); judge of the U.S. District Court for the Central District of California (1985–1989)
- Dorothy Wright Nelson (LL.M. 1956) – judge of the U.S. Ninth Circuit Court of Appeals (1979–1995)
- Richard Lowell Nygaard (B.S. 1969) – judge of the U.S. Third Circuit Court of Appeals (1988–2005)
- David R. Thompson (B.S. 1952, LL.B. 1955) – judge of the U.S. Ninth Circuit Court of Appeals (1985–1998)
- Charles E. Wiggins (B.S. 1953, LL.B. 1956) – judge of the U.S. Ninth Circuit Court of Appeals (1984–1996)

==== U.S. District Court for the Central District of California judges ====
- William Matthew Byrne Jr. (B.S. 1953, LL.B. 1956) – judge of the U.S. District Court for the Central District of California (1971–1998)
- Thurmond Clarke (LL.B. 1927) – judge of the U.S. District Court for the Central District of California (1966–1970); judge of the U.S. District Court for the Southern District of California (1955–1966)
- Elisha Avery Crary (A.B. 1929, LL.B. 1929) – judge of the U.S. District Court for the Central District of California (1966–1975); judge of the U.S. District Court for the Southern District of California (1962–1966)
- Richard Arthur Gadbois Jr. (LL.M. 1960) – judge of the U.S. District Court for the Central District of California (1982–1996)
- Peirson Mitchell Hall (LL.B.) – judge of the U.S. District Court for the Central District of California (1966–1968); judge of the U.S. District Court for the Southern District of California (1942–1966)
- James M. Ideman (J.D. 1963) – judge of the U.S. District Court for the Central District of California (1984–1998)
- David Vreeland Kenyon (J.D. 1957) – judge of the U.S. District Court for the Central District of California (1980–1995)
- George H. King (J.D. 1974) – judge of the U.S. District Court for the Central District of California (1995–present)
- Stephen G. Larson (J.D. 1989) – judge of the U.S. District Court for the Central District of California (2006–2009)
- Nora Margaret Manella (J.D. 1975) – judge of the U.S. District Court for the Central District of California (1998–2006)
- Edward Rafeedie (B.S. 1956, J.D. 1959) – judge of the U.S. District Court for the Central District of California (1982–1996)
- Manuel Real (B.S. 1944) – judge of the U.S. District Court for the Central District of California (1966–2019)
- Albert Lee Stephens Jr. (A.B. 1936, LL.B. 1938) – judge of the U.S. District Court for the Central District of California (1966–1979); judge of the U.S. District Court for the Southern District of California (1961–1966)
- Alicemarie Huber Stotler (B.S. 1964, J.D. 1967) – judge of the U.S. District Court for the Central District of California (1984–2009)
- Robert Mitsuhiro Takasugi (J.D. 1959) – first Japanese American federal judge; judge of the U.S. District Court for the Central District of California (1976–1996)
- Dickran Tevrizian (B.S. 1962, J.D. 1965) – judge of the U.S. District Court for the Central District of California (1985–2005)
- Laughlin Edward Waters, Sr. (J.D. 1947) – judge of the U.S. District Court for the Central District of California (1976–1986)
- David W. Williams (LL.B. 1937) – first African American federal judge west of the Mississippi River; judge of the U.S. District Court for the Central District of California (1969–1981)

==== Other U.S. federal court judges ====
- Harold Michael Fong (A.B. 1960) – judge of the U.S. District Court for the District of Hawaii (1982–1995)
- J. Lawrence Irving (B.S. 1959, LL.B. 1963) – judge of the U.S. District Court for the Southern District of California (1982–1990)
- David W. Ling (LL.B. 1913) – judge of the U.S. District Court for the District of Arizona (1936–1964)
- Leland Chris Nielsen (J.D. 1946) – judge of the U.S. District Court for the Southern District of California (1971–1985)
- William Schwarzer (A.B. 1948) – judge of the U.S. District Court for the Northern District of California (1976–1991)
- Gordon Thompson Jr. (B.S. 1951) – judge of the U.S. District Court for the Southern District of California (1970–1994)
- Howard Boyd Turrentine (LL.B. 1939) – judge of the U.S. District Court for the Southern District of California (1970–1984)
- Oliver Winston Wanger (B.S. 1963) – judge of the U.S. District Court for the Eastern District of California (1991–2006)
- Ronald M. Whyte (J.D. 1967) – judge of the U.S. District Court for the Northern District of California (1992–2009)

==== California Supreme Court justices ====
- David Eagleson (B.A. 1948, LL.B. 1950) – associate justice of the California Supreme Court, 1987–1991
- Douglas L. Edmonds (LL.B. 1910) – associate justice of the California Supreme Court, 1936–1955
- Frederick W. Houser (LL.B. 1900) – associate justice of the California Supreme Court, 1937–1942
- Marcus Kaufman (LL.B. 1956) – associate justice of the California Supreme Court, 1987–1990
- Joyce L. Kennard (B.A. 1970, M.P.A. 1974, J.D. 1974) – first Asian-American to serve as an associate justice of the California Supreme Court, 1989–present
- Malcolm M. Lucas (B.A. 1950, LL.B. 1953) – 26th chief justice of California, 1987–1996; associate justice of the California Supreme Court, 1984–1987; judge of the U.S. District Court for the Central District of California (1971–1984)

==== Other jurists ====
- You Chung Hong (LL.B. 1924, LL.M. 1925) – first Chinese American admitted to practice in California
- Charles Older – California Superior Court judge presiding over trial of Charles Manson; one of the famed Flying Tigers pilots of WWII
- William A. Reppy (LL.B. 1937) – associate justice of the California Second District Court of Appeal, Division Five (1968–1972)
- Mabel Walker Willebrandt (J.D. 1916, LL.M. 1917) – U.S. assistant attorney general, 1921–1929

=== Military ===
- Rudolph B. Davila – United States Army; Medal of Honor recipient
- Ira Eaker (B.A. 1933) – former general of the United States Army Air Forces
- Jack K. Farris (1973) – former major general, United States Air Force
- Sandra Finan (1989) – brigadier general, United States Air Force
- Harold J. Greene – major general, U.S. Army, highest ranking casualty of the War in Afghanistan
- Dennis R. Larsen (1978) – former lieutenant general, United States Air Force
- Viet Xuan Luong – major general, United States Army, deputy commanding general (operations), Eighth United States Army
- William L. McGonagle (1947) – former captain USS Liberty (AGTR-5), United States Navy; Medal of Honor recipient
- Geoffrey Miller (M.A.) – former United States Army major general
- Paul M. Nakasone – lieutenant general, United States Army, commander, United States Army Cyber Command
- William L. Nyland (M.S.) – retired United States Marine Corps four-star general, assistant commandant of the Marine Corps (2002–2005)
- Jerry D. Page (B.S. 1937) – former major general, United States Air Force; commandant, Air War College
- Benjamin L. Salomon (D.D.S. 1937) – United States Army; Medal of Honor recipient
- Gen. Norman Schwarzkopf (M.S.M.E. 1964) – United States Army Four Star General
- Donald B. Smith (M.S.) U.S. Army brigadier general, later sheriff of Putnam County, New York
- Michael J. Williams – retired United States Marine Corps four-star general, Assistant Commandant of the Marine Corps (2000–2002)
- Frances C. Wilson (Ed.D. 1981) – retired United States Marine Corps lieutenant general, former president, National Defense University (2006–2009)
- David G. Young III – former brigadier general, United States Air Force

=== Ambassadors ===
- Daryl Arnold (B.A. 1944) – 8th United States Ambassador to Singapore
- Jack Dyer Crouch, II (B.A. 1980, M.A. 1981, Ph.D. 1987) – former deputy National Security Advisor, former U.S. ambassador to Romania
- Jeffrey Ross Gunter (M.D. 1987) – United States Ambassador to the Republic of Iceland
- Genta H. Holmes (B.A. 1962) – former United States Foreign Service officer and the first U.S. ambassador to Namibia
- Douglas Kmiec (J.D. 1976) – United States ambassador to Malta
- Edward J. Perkins (M.P.A. 1972, Ph.D. 1976) – former U.S. ambassador to Australia, South Africa and the United Nations
- Warren W. Tichenor (B.A. 1982) – 17th United States ambassador to the United Nations in Geneva
- Robert Holmes Tuttle (M.B.A.) – United States Ambassador to the United Kingdom

=== Presidential staff ===
- Herbert G. Klein (B.A. 1940) – former White House communications director
- Fred Ryan (B.A. 1977, J.D. 1980) – assistant and chief of staff for Ronald Reagan
- Donald Segretti (B.A. 1963) – political operative for Richard Nixon
- Ron Ziegler (B.A. 1961) – former White House press secretary

=== State officials ===
- Greg Aghazarian (B.S. 1986) – California State Assemblyman, 2002–2008
- Eugene W. Biscailuz – first Superintendent of the California Highway Patrol, 1929–1931; 27th Los Angeles County Sheriff, 1932–1958
- Jon Carpenter (B.A. 2009) – Missouri state representative, 2013–present
- Mike Davis (EML 2010, Ed.D. 2018) – California State Assembly, 2006-2012
- Jeff DeWit (B.S. 1992) – Arizona State Treasurer, 2015–2018; CFO of NASA, 2018–2020
- Diane Dixon (B.A. 1973) – California State Assemblywoman, 2022–present
- Martha Escutia (B.S. 1979) – California state senator, 1998–2006; California state assemblywoman, 1992–1998
- Matthew Harper (B.S. 1997) – California state assemblyman, 2014–2018; 59th mayor of Huntington Beach, California, 2013–2014
- Paul Heroux (B.A. 2001) – Massachusetts state representative, 2013–2018; mayor of Attleboro, Massachusetts
- Frederick N. Howser (LL.B. 1930) – Attorney General of California, 1947–1951
- Sheila M. Kiscaden (M.P.A. 1986) – Minnesota state senator, 1993–2007
- Tim Leslie (M.P.A. 1969) – California state senator, 1991–2000; California state assemblyman, 1986–1991 and 2000–2006
- Pat Nolan (B.A. 1972, J.D. 1975) – California state assemblyman, 1978–1994, Assembly Republican Leader 1984–1988
- Eloise Reyes (B.S. 1978) – California state senator, 2024–present, Assembly Majority Leader, 2020–2023
- Celeste Rodriguez (M.S.W.) – California state assemblywoman, 2024–present
- Alan Sieroty (LL.B. 1956) – California state senator, 1977–1982; California state assemblyman, 1967–1977
- Jesse M. Unruh (B.A. 1948) – California State Treasurer, 1975–1987; Speaker of the California State Assembly, 1961–1969
- Michael L. Williams (B.A. 1975, M.P.A. 1979, J.D. 1979) – senior commissioner of the Railroad Commission of Texas, 1999–2011

=== Miscellaneous ===
- Ashleigh Aitken (J.D.) – mayor of Anaheim, California
- Lili Bosse – mayor of Beverly Hills, California
- Aja Brown – mayor of Compton, California
- George P. Cronk – Los Angeles City Council member, 1945–1952
- James Dobson (Ph.D. 1967) – conservative evangelical leader
- Charles Elachi (M.B.A. 1978) – director of the Jet Propulsion Laboratory (JPL)
- Troy Edgar – U.S. Deputy Secretary of Homeland Security, 2025–present
- Douglas Emhoff (J.D. 1990) – Second Gentleman of the United States, 2021–2025
- Michael Fabricant (Ph.D. 1978) – British politician and member of parliament
- Sattareh Farman Farmaian (B.A. 1946, M.A. 1948) – social reformer, established Tehran School for Social Work and concept of family planning in Iran
- Frances Feldman – social worker
- John Ferraro (B.S.B.A. 1948) – Los Angeles city council president, 1977–1981, 1987–2001; also former football player
- Gil Garcetti (B.S. 1963) – 39th Los Angeles County District Attorney
- Earl C. Gay (1902–75) – Los Angeles City Council member, 1933–1945
- Michael D. Griffin (M.S.E.E. 1979) – NASA Administrator, 2005–2009
- Roy Hampton (ca. 1901–1953) – Los Angeles City Council member, 1939–1941
- Carl Hoecker – inspector general of the U.S. Securities and Exchange Commission
- Charles A. Holland – Los Angeles City Council member, 1929–1931
- Quentin Kawānanakoa – Hawaiian politician, heir to the throne of the lapsed Kingdom of Hawaii
- Michelle King – superintendent, Los Angeles Unified School District, 2016–2018
- Paul Krekorian (B.A. 1981) – president of the Los Angeles City Council, 2022–present
- Edward L. Masry – lawyer
- Timothy Fok – member of the International Olympic Committee and former member of the Hong Kong Legislative Council
- Cindy Hensley McCain (B.A. 1976, M.A. 1978) – wife of 2008 Republican presidential nominee John McCain and chairwoman of Hensley & Co.
- Dominic J. Monetta – deputy director of defense research and engineering (research and advanced technology) at the U.S. Department of Defense, 1991–1993; director of Office of New Production Reactors, at the United States Department of Energy, 1989–1991
- CeCe Moore (B.A. 1991) – genetic genealogist, television personality and Emmy-nominated producer
- Pat Nixon (B.A. 1937) – First Lady of the United States, 1969–1974
- Sasha Obama (B.A. 2023) – daughter of U.S. President Barack Obama
- Marcus Peacock (B.S. 1982) – deputy administrator, U.S. Environmental Protection Agency
- Reza Pahlavi (B.A. 1985) – former crown prince of Iran, the older son of late Shah Mohammad Reza Pahlavi
- Richard Perle (B.A. 1964) – former assistant United States Secretary of Defense
- Christina Pushaw (B.A. 2012) – political aide and press secretary for Ron DeSantis
- Doria Ragland (M.S.W. 2015) – social worker, yoga instructor, and mother of Meghan, Duchess of Sussex
- Marissa Roy (B.A. 2014) – 44th Los Angeles City Attorney
- Ann Shaw (M.S.W. 1968) – social worker and civic leader in Los Angeles, California
- Daniel Seddiqui (B.A. 2005) – author and adventurer of 50 Jobs in 50 States
- Lorenzo Bini Smaghi (M.A. 1980) – member of the Executive Board of the European Central Bank
- Charles Tillman (M.A. 1962) – mayor of Jackson, Mississippi
- Rosalind Wiener Wyman – political figure

== Print and broadcast media ==
- Millicent Borges Accardi (MPW 1993) – poet and writer, National Endowment for the Arts
- David Bezmozgis (M.F.A.) – writer
- Anthony Boucher (B.A. 1932) – science fiction editor and writer of mystery novels and short stories
- Stacey Bradford (B.A. 1993) – personal finance author, journalist, and commentator
- Ashley Brewer (B.A. 2014) – sports journalist
- Tammy Bruce (B.A. 2002) – author and political commentator
- Art Buchwald (attended the Annenberg School for Communication 1945–48) – author and columnist, Pulitzer Prize winner
- Stan Chambers (B.A. 1944) – television journalist
- Julie Chen (B.A. 1991) – television personality, news anchor, journalist, and producer
- Mark Z. Danielewski (M.F.A. 1993) – author
- Frank Davey (Ph.D. 1968) – poet
- Jerry Del Colliano – journalist, author
- Seth Doane (B.A. 2000) – television journalist
- Maureen Furniss (Ph.D. 1994) – author, animation historian, and USC faculty member
- Joseph Heller – author and satirist
- Jamie Hersch – sportscaster for NHL Network
- Raj Kamal Jha (M.A. 1990) – author, novelist, Indian newspaper editor
- Spencer Johnson (B.A. 1963) – writer
- Pablo Kleinman (B.A. 1996) – political columnist, entrepreneur
- Laila Lalami (Ph.D. 1997) – author and essayist
- Corinne Lee (B.A. 1983) – poet
- Vindy Lee (B.A. 2004) – cookbook author and professional chef
- Sandra Tsing Loh (M.P.W. 1984) – radio commentator and author
- Bob Lorenz (B.A. Broadcast Journalism) – studio host, anchor, New York Yankees (YES Network)
- Marie Lu (B.A. 2006) – author
- Arash Markazi (B.A. 2004) – journalist, writer for Sports Illustrated
- Stephanie Miller – radio and TV personality, host of The Stephanie Miller Show
- C. L. Moore (B.A. 1956, M.A. 1963) – science fiction and fantasy writer
- Wayétu Moore (M.F.A.) – author, publisher, social entrepreneur
- Josh Moser (B.A. 2010) – journalist and sportscaster
- Sheila Nazarian (MMM) – plastic surgeon and television personality
- Joan Lowery Nixon (B.A. 1947) – journalist and author
- John Norman (M.A. 1957) – science fiction author and philosopher
- Téa Obreht, formerly Téa Bajrakterević (B. A. 2007) – novelist, The Tiger's Wife
- Petros Papadakis (B.A.) – sportscaster
- Alexandra Pelosi (M.A. 1993) – journalist and documentary filmmaker
- Tucker Reed – blogger, author, journalist and feminist activist
- Katherine Schwarzenegger – author
- Joe Sheehan (B.A. 1994) – sportswriter and co-founder of Baseball Prospectus
- Lindsay Soto (B.A. 1998) – television sports journalist and producer
- Suzy Spencer – true-crime writer
- Irving Stone (M.A. 1924) – writer, known for biographical novels of famous historical personalities
- Michele Tafoya (M.B.A. 1991) – NBC sportscaster
- Brad Thor – author
- Toni Tipton-Martin (1981) – Culinary historian and journalist
- Paul Vangelisti (M.A. 1970) – poet and broadcaster
- Vanessa Angélica Villarreal (Ph.D 2024) – poet, essayist, and cultural critic
- Alex Witt – news anchor
- Linda Yu (B.A. 1968) – Chicago television journalist

== Other ==
- Gary Anderson (B.Arch. 1970, M.Arch 1971) – creator of the universal recycling symbol
- Ethel Percy Andrus (M.A. 1928, Ph.D. 1930) – founder of the American Association of Retired Persons (AARP)
- Wanda Austin (Ph.D. 1988) – president and CEO of The Aerospace Corporation, NAE
- Kathryn Beaumont (1938 D.E.) – actress, voice actress, singer, and school teacher
- Adam Bezark – writer and creative director
- Anita Caspary (1943) – former nun, founder of lay organization
- Jenova Chen (M.F.A.) – video game designer, co-founder f thatgamecompany
- Joe Medicine Crow (M.A. 1938, honorary doctorate 2003) – last war chief of the Crow Tribe of Montana and historian
- Salvatore Ferragamo – fashion designer
- Frank Fertitta (B.A./B.S. 1984) – CEO of Station Casinos; owner of Zuffa, LLC, the entity that runs the Ultimate Fighting Championship
- Reuben Fine (Ph.D. 1948) – chess grandmaster, psychologist
- Sei Fujii (1882 1954) (1911 graduate of USC Law) – civil rights leader, labor unionizer, race relations advocate, and publisher; first Japanese American to receive a posthumous law license in California
- Joseph Gutheinz (M.S.S.M 1984) – retired NASA OIG Senior Special Agent, founder of the Moon Rock Project, lawyer, educator, author, commissioner
- Irene Hirano Inouye (BA 1970, MPA 1973) – president United States-Japan Council and chair Ford Foundation Board of Trustees
- Erin M. Jacobson – music industry attorney
- Olivia Jade – YouTube personality and social media influencer
- Cliff Johnson (B.F.A. 1974) – author of award-winning computer puzzle games
- Jeff Kaplan – video game director; current vice president of Blizzard Entertainment; known for his design work in World of Warcraft; lead designer of Overwatch
- Robert Kardashian (B.S. 1966) – attorney, known for his role in the murder trial of O. J. Simpson and for being the father of Kourtney, Kim, Khloé, and Rob Kardashian
- Kathryn Le Veque – author
- Omar Maani – former mayor of Amman, Jordan
- Valentino Mazzia (1922–1999) – forensic anesthesiologist
- Tom Morey (B.A. 1957) – creator of the Boogie Board
- Nadir Nibras – YouTube personality and travel vlogger
- Sean Plott (M.F.A.) – e-sports commentator for StarCraft II and former pro gamer
- Joyce K. Reynolds – computer scientist
- Lauren Sánchez Bezos - journalist and Jeff Bezos' wife
- Kellee Santiago (M.F.A.) – video game designer, co-founder of thatgamecompany
- Sakaye Shigekawa – obstetrician
- Vada Somerville – civil rights activist
- Mahmooda Sultana (B.S. 2004) – NASA research engineer
- Brian Sun (J.D.) – trial lawyer
- Kerry Wendell Thornley – author
- Camille Vasquez – attorney in Depp v. Heard defamation lawsuit
- Joseph Wapner (B.A. 1941, J.D. 1948) – judge of television's The People's Court, former Los Angeles County Superior Court judge
- Essie Mae Washington-Williams (M.A.) – educator, writer, daughter of Strom Thurmond
- Eugene Lee Yang – YouTube personality, most famously known for The Try Guys, and filmmaker
- John Zerzan – anarchist and primitivist philosopher

== Notable faculty members ==
=== A–K ===
- Arthur W. Adamson – chemist
- Leonard M. Adleman – co-inventor of RSA, Turing Award laureate
- William French Anderson – genetics professor, dubbed "father of gene therapy"
- Michael A. Arbib – computational neuroscience professor
- Norman Arnheim – geneticist
- Jonathan Aronson – professor of communication and international relations
- Tim Asch – professor at the Center for Visual Anthropology
- Lois W. Banner – former president of the American Studies Association, author
- Richard Bellman – inventor of dynamic programming
- George A. Bekey – professor in computer science
- Aimee Bender – novelist
- Warren Bennis – university professor, Distinguished Professor of Business Administration; named the "dean of leadership gurus" by Forbes magazine
- Susanna Berger – art historian, 2019 Guggenheim Fellow
- Shelley Berman – comedian, actor, author; taught Writing Humor, Literary and Dramatic
- Terence Blanchard – jazz trumpeter
- Barry Boehm – software engineering economics expert, inventor of COCOMO
- Todd Boyd – author, media commentator, producer, and consultant
- T.C. Boyle – novelist
- Leo Braudy -cultural historian and film critic and theorist
- Christian Busch business professor, recognized for his work on serendipity, innovation, and purpose-driven leadership
- Anton Burg – professor of Chemistry
- Leo Buscaglia – author and motivational speaker
- Giuseppe Caire – telecommunications engineer
- Paula Cannon – geneticist and virologist
- Drew Casper – film historian
- Manuel Castells – sociologist, played a key role in the development of a Marxist urban sociology
- John Choma – analog and mixed signal circuit designer
- Pinchas Cohen – dean of the USC Leonard Davis School of Gerontology
- Thomas Crow – art critic, director of the Getty Research Institute
- Eileen M. Crimmins – AARP Chair in Gerontology at the USC Davis School of Gerontology
- António Damásio – physician and neurologist
- Paul Debevec – graphics researcher
- Rod Dedeaux – baseball coach
- Richard Dekmejian – expert on international relations
- Jerry Donohue – theoretical and physical chemist
- Richard Easterlin – economics professor
- Mar Elepano – artist, animator, filmmaker
- Susan Estrich – author, law professor; former campaign manager, Michael Dukakis for president
- Percival Everett – novelist
- Rachel Feldman – director, screenwriter
- Caleb E. Finch – Alzheimer's disease researcher
- Scott Fisher – pioneering virtual reality researcher
- Eric Fossum – inventor of CMOS image sensor
- James Franco – Academy Award nominated actor, taught film classes
- Eric Garcetti – mayor of Los Angeles
- Placida Gardner Chesley – taught at USC, City Bacteriologist, Red Cross worker in WWI
- Tom Garrison – marine science professor, writer of Emmy Award-winning show and 15 textbooks, and Korean War Naval Officer who taught nuclear physics
- Murray Gell-Mann – professor of Physics and Medicine, Nobel laureate in Physics
- Barry Glassner – sociologist, made an appearance in Bowling for Columbine
- Solomon W. Golomb – mathematician, invented the Golomb coding and Golomb ruler
- Jane Goodall – distinguished adjunct professor of anthropology
- Midori Gotō – violinist and the Jascha Heifetz Chair in Music
- Eva Gustavson – opera singer
- Judith Halberstam – gender theorist
- Ted Harris – mathematician, former president of the Institute of Mathematical Statistics
- Ewald Heer – aerospace engineer specialising in autonomous robots
- Jascha Heifetz – violinist, one of the most famous of the 20th century
- Tomlinson Holman – inventor of Lucasfilm's THX sound system
- John Hospers – philosopher, first presidential candidate of the United States Libertarian Party
- bell hooks – writer
- Henry Jenkins – media scholar
- A. Quincy Jones – residential architect and influential figure in modern urban planning concepts, USC dean of Architecture
- Mark Kac – mathematician, pioneered the modern development of probability
- Steve A. Kay – biologist
- Bart Kosko – professor of electrical engineering, fuzzy logic authority
- Stephen Krashen – linguist and educational researcher
- Timur Kuran – economist, specializing in the study of Islamic finance and its consequences

=== L–Z ===
- Jerome Lawrence – playwright
- Kurt Lehovec – creator of the p-n junction isolation technique in integrated circuits
- Jerry Lewis
- Hao Li – professor of Computer Science, CEO of Pinscreen Inc., director of the Vision and Graphics Lab at the USC Institute for Creative Technologies
- Robert C. Lipsett – violin pedagogue
- David Lloyd – professor of English and political activist
- Raymond Loewy – industrial designer
- Valter Longo – biogerontologist, cell biologist, Nobel Prize nominee
- Leonard Maltin – film critic
- Daniel McFadden – econometrician, Nobel Prize winner in 2000
- AnnMaria De Mars – 1984 Judo World Champion, mother of Ronda Rousey; Statistical Consultant at USC
- Mardik Martin – screenwriter, Raging Bull, Mean Streets
- C. L. Moore – science fiction writer
- Barbara Myerhoff – professor at the Center for Visual Anthropology
- Richard Neutra – modernist architect
- George Olah – Nobel laureate in Chemistry
- Ishu Patel – artist, director, animator, and photographer
- Massoud Pedram – computer engineer
- William Pereira – architect and urban planner
- Gregor Piatigorsky – cellist
- John Pollini – professor of art history
- Jon Postel – Internet pioneer, former director of Information Sciences Institute's Computer Networks Division
- Ishwar Puri – professor of aerospace and mechanical engineering, vice president of research
- Claudia Rankine – poet
- Irving S. Reed – inventor of Reed–Solomon codes
- Andrew Robinson – actor
- Everett Rogers – professor of communications
- Lisa Roma – chair of grand opera in the College of Music, 1930
- Steven J. Ross – professor of history, Pulitzer Prize for History finalist
- Steven B. Sample – professor of electrical engineering and leadership, noted author, USC president
- Morton O. Schapiro – economist, president of Williams College and Northwestern University
- Parish Sedghizadeh – clinical and surgical oral and maxillofacial pathologist
- Eudice Shapiro – violinist
- Robert Scheer – journalist and social political activist
- Otto Schnepp – professor of chemistry
- Arnold Schoenberg – composer
- Hubert Selby Jr. – novelist, screenwriter, Last Exit to Brooklyn, Requiem for a Dream
- Gale Sinatra – educational psychologist, distinguished professor
- Scott Soames – professor of philosophy
- Jacob Soll – historian, philosopher, political advisor, MacArthur "Genius" Grant fellow
- Esther Somerfeld-Ziskind – neurologist and psychiatrist
- Craig Stanford – professor of biological anthropology
- Halsey Stevens – composer
- Gay Talese – one of the founders of New Journalism
- Shirley Thomas – professor of technical writing
- Lee Edward Travis – psychiatrist and speech pathologist
- Jovan Vavic – former head coach of the USC men's and women's water polo teams
- Arieh Warshel – Nobel laureate in Chemistry
- Michael S. Waterman – founding editor of Journal of Computational Biology
- Paul Wehrle – physician who helped in the development of methods for the prevention and treatment of polio and smallpox
- Dallas Willard – philosophy professor, author of Divine Conspiracy and other important Christian works, speaker
- Curt Wittig – professor of physical chemistry
- Darryl F. Zanuck – major figure in the Hollywood studio system
