= Mohamed Bechri =

Tunisian economist

Mohamed Bechri is a professor of economics at the University of Sousse, Tunisia. He holds a Ph.D. in Economics from the University of Southern California.

== Human rights activism ==
He is a human rights activist and former chair of the Tunisian section of Amnesty International. Human Rights Watch cites him in its report on the repression of human rights in Tunisia.

== Statements ==
He is quoted as blaming the Arab silence of Darfur genocide as part of the "twin fascisms" that dominate the Middle East: Islamism and Pan-Arabism. The former pertains to the rejection of the legitimacy of any non-Muslim group within what is perceived as the Arab's proper domain whereas the latter holds the same view - this time - towards any non-Arab group. According to Bechri, these developments gave rise to a condition where all minorities living within the Arab world are under siege, particularly underscoring the impact of Islamism as "the mother of all big lies'. He also lodged strong criticism of the West, noting that the level of freedom found in its societies gave Islamist terror masters ample opportunity to mount an effective propaganda machine. considering all these factors, Bechri stressed that only Arab/Muslim secular forces can effectively undermine Islamism.

== Persecution ==
Bechri often experienced persecution due to his human rights initiatives in Tunisia. In 2000, for example, he was part of a group, which were assaulted and threatened by police officers in Tunis. Bechri was a coordinator of the National Committee to Defend Moncef Marzouki, who was dismissed from his post due to his human rights activities. Together with fellow activists and a gaggle of journalists including Omar Mestiri, editor of the opposition online newspaper Kalima, they proceeded to the ministry of public health to deliver a petition requesting for Marzouki's reinstatement. They were, however, blocked by the police when they reached the building's entrance. When Mestiri resisted, he was beaten by the police before being apprehended and released fifty kilometers away from the location. Reporters Without Borders and Mohammed Bechri, both human rights activists, confirmed this incident.
