= Elise Golgowski =

American dramatist

Elise Golgowski is an American actress, playwright, and film maker in Los Angeles, CA.

== Early life ==
Originally from Orlando, FL she attended Valencia Community College for her Associates in Theatre before transferring to the University of Southern California where she received her Bachelors in Theatre.

== Career ==
=== Acting ===
"As an actress she has worked with: Disney, Hard Rock Company, Williamstown Theatre Festival, Valencia Character Company, Slanderous Tongues, Mad Cow Theatre, Orlando Shakespeare Company, Checkerboard Productions at the Florida Fringe Festival, Brand New Theatre, Women’s Theatre Organization at USC, Fullsail Films, Divine Distractions, and several college film schools and independent productions." At USC she portrayed Mrs. Gottlieb in Dead Man's Cell Phone by Sarah Ruhl and Janie in One Man's Trash by Zury Margarita Ruiz.

=== Playwrighting ===
Elise has had three plays produced: The Dumpster Boy and the Chicken Girl, Make My Van Gogh, and The Caterpillar's Dilemma. Her play The Dumpster Boy and the Chicken Girl was nominated for a Theatre Student Association award for Best Student Written Work at USC in spring of 2011. In the summer of 2011 she performed Make My Van Gogh, a solo play, at the Open Fist Theatre for the Hollywood Fringe Festival. The USC student group Brand New Theatre produced The Caterpillar's Dilemma for their spring 2012 one act festival.

=== Film making ===
Elise creates her own independent films with her production company Mojave Films. Her short art house films Bike Traffick and Dada Suicide have been featured in a theatre course taught at USC.
