= Paula Cannon =

American biologist

- Education: University of Liverpool, UK
- Scientific career
- Fields: Genetics
- Workplaces: University of Southern California (USC)

Paula Cannon is a British geneticist and virologist, Distinguished Professor of Molecular Microbiology & Immunology at the University of Southern California. She is a specialist in gene therapy, hematopoietic stem cells, and human immunodeficiency virus (HIV) with particular interest in gene editing and humanized mice.

== Personal life and education ==
She received her PhD from the University of Liverpool, and postdoctoral training at both Oxford and Harvard

== Academic career ==
Cannon's recent work is aimed at disrupting the CCR viral co-receptor, CCR5, using zinc finger nucleases(ZFNs). She also studies SARS-CoV-2 and highly pathogenic hemorrhagic fever viruses, including Ebola and Lassa fever viruses.

== Selected publications ==
Her most cited peer-reviewed publications are:

- Soneoka Y, Cannon PM, Ramsdale EE, Griffiths JC, Romano G, Kingsman SM, Kingsman AJ. A transient three-plasmid expression system for the production of high titer retroviral vectors. Nucleic Acids research. 1995 Feb 25;23(4):628-33. open access Cited 932 times, according to Google Scholar,
- Holt N, Wang J, Kim K, Friedman G, Wang X, Taupin V, Crooks GM, Kohn DB, Gregory PD, Holmes MC, Cannon PM. Human hematopoietic stem/progenitor cells modified by zinc-finger nucleases targeted to CCR5 control HIV-1 in vivo. Nature Biotechnology. 2010 Aug;28(8):839-47. Cited 762 times, according to Google Scholar
- Deeks SG, Lewin SR, Ross AL, Ananworanich J, Benkirane M, Cannon P, Chomont N, Douek D, Lifson JD, Lo YR, Kuritzkes D. International AIDS Society global scientific strategy: towards an HIV cure 2016. Nature Medicine. 2016 Aug;22(8):839-50. Cited 375 times, according to Google Scholar
- Gardner MR, Kattenhorn LM, Kondur HR, Von Schaewen M, Dorfman T, Chiang JJ, Haworth KG, Decker JM, Alpert MD, Bailey CC, Neale ES. AAV-expressed eCD4-Ig provides durable protection from multiple SHIV challenges. Nature. 2015 Mar;519(7541):87-91. Cited 275 times, according to Google Scholar
- Wang J, Exline CM, DeClercq JJ, Llewellyn GN, Hayward SB, Li PW, Shivak DA, Surosky RT, Gregory PD, Holmes MC, Cannon PM. Homology-driven genome editing in hematopoietic stem and progenitor cells using ZFN mRNA and AAV6 donors. Nature biotechnology. 2015 Dec;33(12):1256-63. Cited 242 times, according to Google Scholar
