= Nadir Nibras =

Bangladeshi travel blogger

- নাদির নিবরাস
- Born: Dinajpur, Bangladesh
- Education: Oklahoma State University; University of Southern California
- Years active: 2016–present

YouTube information
- Channels: Nadir On The Go; Nadir On The Go - Bangla
- Genres: Travel; Country history

Nadir Nibras (Bengali: নাদির নিবরাস) is a Bangladeshi travel filmmaker and content creator. He is best known for his YouTube channel Nadir On The Go. His content, produced in both English and Bengali, explores travel, history, culture, food, and the stories of people from destinations around the world.

He received the Channel i Digital Media Award for Best YouTube Content Creator in 2021 and 2022, the Marvel of Tomorrow Influencers Award in the Travel category in 2021, the TikTok Bangladesh Creator Award for Creator of the Year in 2024, and The Daily Star OTT & Digital Content Award for Best Content Creator in 2021, 2022, and 2024.

== Education ==
Nadir was born in Dinajpur in northern Bangladesh. His father worked as a dental surgeon. The family eventually settled in Dhaka, where he completed his O and A Levels at an English-medium school. In 2011, he moved to the United States, earning a bachelor's degree in mechanical engineering at Oklahoma State University. Nadir participated in international study abroad programs through Oklahoma State University, including a semester abroad in Iceland. Nadir also helped lead efforts to improve the university’s sexual violence prevention education policies and advocated for fair labor practices by encouraging the university to ensure that its licensed apparel was not sourced from sweatshops.

== Career ==
Nadir began making travel videos in 2016. For the first four years, his YouTube channel had fewer than 100 subscribers. During the COVID-19 lockdown in 2020, Nadir focused on improving his filmmaking, and his productions subsequently went viral. One early video about visa-free countries available to Bangladeshi passport holders gained widespread attention and rapidly expanded his audience. In 2026, Nadir appeared in the twelfth episode of the Neftlix travel series Drew Binsky: Ultimate Travler, wherein he and American travel filmmaker Drew Binsky explored traffic conditions in Dhaka, Bangladesh. As of 2026, Nadir estimates he has been to around 80 countries.

== Awards and achievements ==
Award	Year	Category	Result	Ref.
Blender's Choice – The Daily Star OTT & Digital Content Awards	2024	Best Content Creator (Food & Recipe/Travel)	Won	
Channel i Digital Media Awards	2021	Best YouTube Content Creator	Won	
Channel i Digital Media Awards	2022	Best YouTube Content Creator	Won	
The Daily Star OTT & Digital Content Awards	2021	Best Content Creator (Travel Vlog)	Won	
The Daily Star OTT & Digital Content Awards	2022	Best Content Creator (Travel Vlog)	Won	
The Daily Star OTT & Digital Content Awards	2023	Best Content Creator (Travel Vlog)	Won	
Marvel of Tomorrow Influencers Award	2021	Travel	Won	
TikTok Bangladesh Creator Awards	2024	Creator of the Year	Won	
