= Vindy Lee =

Indonesian chef and cookbook author

- Born: November 23, 1983 (age 42); Jakarta, Indonesia
- Occupations: Celebrity chef, TV personality, Cookbook author, Model

Vindy Lee is an Indonesian celebrity chef, author of three cookbooks, and a certified etiquette trainer. Known as the "Queen of Slay" of Indonesia, her viral etiquette videos has gained popularity through various social media platforms. In August 2024, Lee obtained a certification as an etiquette trainer, as a Graduate of The English Manner and Beaumont Etiquette's Train the Trainer Grade One with distinction. Her menu has been featured in Westin Hotel, Jakarta 2022. Lee previously hosted several television shows since 2011 including her own cooking show, Sexy Food, on Transvision (Indonesia); a ready meal food delivery project in Jakarta, which features her signature Beauty Secret Meals.

In 2012-2014 Lee represented Jakarta Tourism Board for Enjoy Jakarta Festivals as chef in Singapore, California, and Taiwan where she prepared authentic Indonesian food for hundreds of notable figures.

== Biography ==
Born in Jakarta, Indonesia 23 November 1983 to an Indonesian Mother and Taiwanese father, Lee moved to Singapore at age 7 to attend primary and high school. In 1999, she moved to Los Angeles, briefly attending Santa Monica College before transferring to the University of Southern California, where she graduated with a Bachelor of Arts degree, double majoring in International relations and East Asian language and culture.

== Cooking career ==
After her graduation from USC, Lee took various restaurant positions, including sous chef at a Champagne French Bakery & Cafe in Beverly Hills, California, cocktail waitress at McCormick & Schmick's seafood restaurant, and a managerial position in Rosti Italian Restaurant at Westlake Village, California. Ultimately, Lee decided to pursue her culinary career as a full-time personal chef.

In 2012 Lee represented Jakarta Tourism Board in the "Enjoy Jakarta" cultural event at the W Hotel Los Angeles, Hollywood and W Hotel San Francisco, California in liaison with the Indonesian Consulate General, preparing Indonesian food in the prestigious W Hotels for notable VIPs and political delegates. This was also held in 2013 in Singapore, and 2014 at the Grand Hyatt Hotel Taipei.

Vindy Lee also serves as a board member of Indonesian Chef Association since 2017.

== Cookbook author ==
Lee published her first cookbook, Sexy Food, in November 2010. Published by Gramedia Pustaka Utama, the book contains recipes inspired by Lee's experiences as a professional chef, presented in a sensual and artistic manner. Her second book, published 2017 entitled Food Lover, is currently available for loan in Singapore National Library and available for sale in Indonesia bookstores. In 2022, Lee wrote her first bilingual cookbook entitled The Best Recipes of Indonesian Professional Chefs. The book - in English and Indonesian, is available for sale at Gramedia Indonesia

== Modeling ==
Lee was coined FHM Indonesia's Top 100 Sexiest Women 2015 for the 5th year. She has appeared several times in the "Top 100 Sexiest Women" lists of FHM Romania and FHM Indonesia. 2011, 2012 and 2013. Lee has been considered one of the "Top Five Sexiest Women of Indonesia" since 2012. Lee also won the title of MAXIM Indonesia's "Hometown Hottie" 2009, Esquire Indonesia November 2017, and was featured on the cover of FHM Malaysia in November 2010 and Wanita Indonesia in April 2012. She has been featured in several international magazines, including 10 international FHM features, Maxim, and appeared on the cover of Nepal's Food & Wine magazine in August 2009.

== TV personality ==
Lee previously her own cooking show, Sexy Food, on Transvision (Indonesia), adapted from her first cookbook. She has been cooking on Indonesian national TV since 2011. Acting as a food critic for such shows as Jakarta Belum Tidur on AnTV, Lee has appeared regularly in DahSyat show RCTI as chef. Lee also hosted her own cooking segment, "Dapur Cantik" on Trans 7 as chef. Lee appeared as chef on several episodes of the live 811 Show of MetroTV. She hosted the "Taste of Indonesia" segment on Indonesia Now of MetroTV with Executive Chef Vindex Tengker of Four Seasons Hotels and Resorts Jakarta.

== Ready Meal Delivery Service ==
In May 2017, Lee started her ready meal food delivery service in Jakarta. Lee features her signature Beauty Secret Meals with all-natural recipes for maintaining weight and healthy body, along with her line of beauty supplement drinks.

== Indonesia's Queen of Slay ==
In 2022, Lee has been coined the "Viral Chef of Indonesia" due to her popular social media presence The "Queen of Slay" is hence known for popularizing the word "Slay" in Indonesia Her table manners video on eating Nasi Padang with British Formal Dining etiquette has gathered over 50 million views across various social media platforms. Lee shares tips on table manners, social etiquette and culinary hacks. Her viral videos include eating traditional Indonesian cuisine Nasi Padang, Indonesian Baso, Mie Ayam, street food like Pecel Lele; and kitchen hacks on how to open "Salak" snake skin fruit has raised tens of millions of views across several social media platforms
