= Blair Westlake =

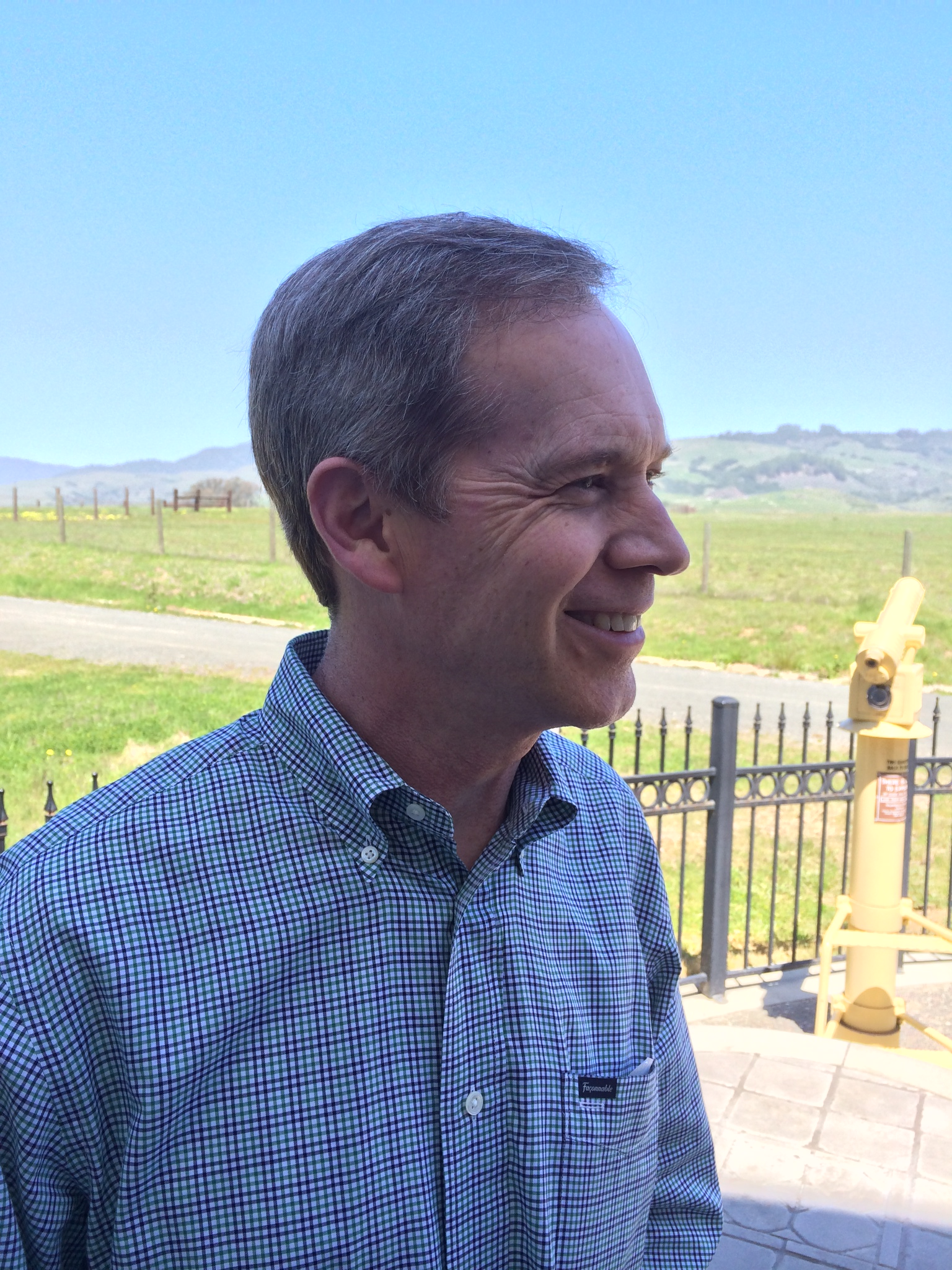
- Education: University of Southern California, Whittier Law School
- Occupation: Media executive

Blair Westlake is the former corporate vice president of media and entertainment at Microsoft Corporation, where he oversaw the group responsible for the licensing of movies, television shows, music, and other media for Microsoft products, which included Xbox Live, Xbox Video and Xbox Music services, Windows PCs/tablets and Windows Phones. Prior to Microsoft, Westlake was chairman at Universal Television and Networks Group.

== Microsoft ==
During 2004 to 2014, Westlake was vice president of media and entertainment for Microsoft Corporation. In that role, he was a liaison and dealmaker with the global media and entertainment industries, including the Hollywood studios, broadcast, networks, cable television networks, and the music industry, leading the company's global media and entertainment partnership development.

During his Microsoft tenure, Westlake brought these partnerships to the Xbox: the Windows and Windows Phone marketplace, 300,000 feature films and television programs, 17 million songs, and exclusive interactive content for Xbox and sponsorship deal for Microsoft's Surface with the NFL. Notably, these landmark content deals also normalized the idea that devices traditionally removed from the internet should be web-connected, multimedia workhorses delivering large amounts of content to consumers. To this end, Westlake also testified before the Senate Commerce Committee at a hearing on the emergence of online video

== MCA Inc. and Universal Studios ==
Westlake began his career as an attorney in the law department at MCA Inc./Universal Studios in 1982, and rose to become Chairman of Universal Television & Networks Group after holding various roles including Executive Vice President of the Universal Studios Home Entertainment Group and President of Universal Pay Television. Among his accomplishments at Universal, Westlake successfully pivoted the traditional domestic syndication model into a global distribution network responsible for the command of the content marketplace the company still enjoys today. Westlake is also responsible for pioneering and spearheading joint ventures with HBO Asia, CineCanal in Latin America and Telecine in Brazil, and more than a dozen international channels, along with long-term, multibillion-dollar channel carriage and content licensing agreements with Kirch Group, Canal Plus, Stream in Italy and Sogecable in Spain. At the time, Sogecable was at the unexplored frontier of the distribution and licensing universe. Westlake also oversaw the global licensing of Universal's post-home video library of more than 5,000 motion pictures and more than 40,000 television episodes, negotiating groundbreaking agreements with the former Tele-Communications Inc. and Encore Media for all of Universal's new release motion pictures. This led to the launch of the Starz premium movie channel, and later to the first-ever "split-slate" pay TV output deal with HBO and Starz.

== Board memberships ==
Westlake is a member of the Television Academy, the Academy of Motion Pictures Arts and Sciences, and the International Television Academy. He serves on the board of directors of EMP Museum – Music + Sci-fi + Pop Culture, founded by Microsoft co-founder Paul Allen, in Seattle, WA, the board of directors of Cinedigm Corp. (NASDAQ: CIDM), the board of directors of KCTS 9, PBS station Seattle/Tacoma WA, and on the board of advisors of Swank Motion Pictures, Inc., St. Louis, Missouri.

== Education ==
Westlake received his Bachelor of Arts from the University of Southern California and Juris Doctor from Whittier Law School

Westlake was the first recipient of the Whittier College School of Law Alumni Award for Business Excellence, also receiving awards from the Association of Media and Entertainment Counsel, the Video Hall of Fame, and the Digital Leadership Award from Multichannel News/Broadcasting & Cable.
