= Frances Feldman =

Frances Lomas Feldman
- Born: December 3, 1912; Philadelphia, Pennsylvania
- Died: September 30, 2008 (aged 95)
- Education: University of Southern California Bachelor's Degree (1935) Master's Degree in Social Work (1940)
- Occupations: Social activist, University of Southern California professor

Frances Lomas Feldman (1912–2008) was an American social worker and professor at the University of Southern California. She is perhaps best known for conducting a milestone, multi-year three-volume study in the 1970s for the American Cancer Society which provided the first systematic evidence that cancer patients faced discrimination in the workplace. Her areas of teaching had to do with social welfare, including its history, welfare policy, and administration. Her research and writings examine the psychological, social, and economic meanings of money and work in American families.

== Biography ==
=== Early years ===
Frances Lomas Feldman had five older siblings and was born on December 3, 1912, in Philadelphia to Jewish parents who had immigrated to the US from Ukraine. At eight years old, she and her family moved to Los Angeles, Ca.

She became a student in 1931 at the Los Angeles University of Southern California. There's some evidence she provided laundry services to pay for her tuition, and graduated in 1935 with a bachelor's degree. She went back to USC and in 1940 she graduated with a master's degree for Social Work.

In 1935 she married a research chemist named Albert Feldman, who also became a social worker. He worked at the University of Southern California Andrus Gerontology Center as deputy director, which he continued until he died in 1975.

=== Social work and research ===
Her research provided evidence that employers and co-workers often imposed harsh and illegal conditions on cancer survivors. According to the National Association of Social Workers, several states modified fair employment legislation because of the study.

In 1934, she became a social worker and administrator in the public welfare and the family service fields, focusing on social policy and administration. Her initial research was on the effect money stress has on families. This led her to found a national network of nonprofit credit counseling services called Consumer Credit Counselors with George Nickel, and 280 continue to exist under the auspices of the National Consumer Credit Association.

She established the first faculty and staff counseling center at USC, now a blueprint for employee assistance programs across the country.

She has served on a number of state and national committees and commissions, including chairing the Governor's Advisory Committee on Mental Health.

In 1954 she became faculty member at University of Southern California for the School of Social Work. She worked as a professor and then as a professor emerita until 1982 when she officially retired. She continued to visit the campus twice a week and continued to pursue research in the psychological and social meanings of money and work in family life. She died on September 30, 2008, a week after having a stroke.

Feldman was the author of 10 books and published many research papers and journal articles dedicated to the social or psychological meaning of life and work. She won the 2004 Wheat Award from the Southern California Historical Society for one of her works entitled "Human Services in the City of Angels: 1850-2000," which she completed under the auspices of the Los Angeles City Historical Society.

In 2005, she was inducted into the California Social Work Archives Hall of Distinction.
