= Gale Sinatra =

Educational psychologist

Gale M. Sinatra
- Occupation: Distinguished Professor
- Known for: science learning, motivation, conceptual change

Academic background
- Education: University of Massachusetts (B.A., M.S., PhD)

Academic work
- Discipline: Educational Psychology
- Institutions: USC · Rossier School of Education

Gale M. Sinatra is an American educational psychologist known for her leadership and research on climate science education, education psychology, and enhancing the public's interest of science. She was instrumental in developing the conceptual change learning model. Sinatra is a distinguished professor of Psychology and the Stephen H. Crocker Chair of Education at the University of Southern California (USC). She was the Chair of the American Psychological Association (APA) Climate Change Task Force and previously served as the President and Editor of APA's Division 15 journal, Educational Psychology. In 2022, Sinatra was elected to the National Academy of Education, an organization for researchers who have advanced policy and practice in their research.

== Education and employment ==
=== University of Massachusetts (UMASS) ===
Sinatra received her Bachelor of Arts in Psychology from the University of Massachusetts (UMASS) in 1981 and during her time at UMASS, she was elected president of Psi Chi, the undergraduate honor society in psychology. As an undergraduate, she was a project coordinator for UMASS's National Evaluation System based on the development and administration of teacher certification examinations and assessments. She continued her education, studying psychology at UMASS, and completed her Master of Science and PhD in Psychology with a minor in Educational Measurement in 1989. As a graduate student, Sinatra was supervised by Dr. James M. Royer, where her dissertation focused primarily on the effectiveness of a computer-based assessment system called the System for the Assessment of Reading Competencies, designed to measure reading ability. After graduation, Sinatra was a postdoctoral fellow with Dr. Isabel Beck at the University of Pittsburgh's Learning Research and Development Center. Her early work with Dr. Beck focused on how text coherence influences students' reading comprehension in content areas. Sinatra continued this work when she joined the faculty of the University of Utah from 1991 to 2000, where she was an associate professor in the Department of Educational Psychology, earning her a starter grant on techniques of decoding instructions in children's reading, and later became the Director of Assessment of the Utah Reading Center.

=== University of Nevada, Las Vegas (UNLV) ===
After nine years of researching with the Department of Educational Studies at the University of Utah, in 2000, Sinatra became an associate research professor of the Department of Educational Psychology at the University of Nevada, Las Vegas (UNLV). Along with researching about conceptual change, she was on various UNVL's committees of Faculty Senate, Graduate College, University Assessment, and President's advisory (to name a few). In 2005, UNLV appointed her as Professor of Educational Psychology and was the first faculty member of the College of Education to be awarded a National Science Foundation (NSF) Synthesis Grant to investigate the challenges of learning and teaching biological evolution in educational settings. She served as Associate Dean of the Graduate College, and then Interim Dean for three years.

=== University of Southern California (USC) ===
In 2011, Sinatra was a visiting professor at the Rossier School of Education at the University of Southern California (USC) and USC promoted her rapidly to full professor in 2012, Associate Dean for Research in 2016, and Distinguished Professor in 2024. She has taught seminars in psychology and education on topics such as cognitive development, human learning and development while supervising students who have gone to become professors at universities across the United States. As a result of her contributions in teaching, she was awarded as a recipient of the USC Undergraduate Teaching Award. Sinatra has also committed to USC's university service by being chair or member of various committees focusing on sustainability education, academic programming, and provost's office. She also directs the Motivated Change Research Lab, contributing to research on cognitive and motivational learning in STEM along with concentrations in climate science and evolution education. The Motivated Change Research Lab has received multiple honors and citations in the realm of psychology and education including the recipient of the USC Rossier School of Education Excellence in Research Award.

Sinatra has been a featured speaker at multiple national research conferences, including the annual Research for Impact Conference at USC, the European Association for Research on Learning and Instruction, and Philosophy, Politics, and Economics (PPE) at the University of North Carolina at Chapel Hill. She is also an author and co-author in prominent research journals and books in education psychology, including a recent book with fellow colleague and psychologist, Dr. Barbara Hofer from Middlebury College: Science Denial: Why it Happens and What to Do About It (2023), published by Oxford University Press. Other co-author publications, involving the APA educational psychology handbook, Vol 1: Theories, constructs, and critical issues (2012), and Intentional conceptual change (2003).

== Research ==
=== STEM learning and motivation ===
Sinatra is interested in the challenges of defining and measuring student engagement, a factor associated with outcomes and perseverance in science, technology, engineering, and mathematics (STEM) fields. Sinatra and her colleagues explored in The Challenges of Defining and Measuring Student Engagement in Science, how engagement is often described as "the holy grail" of student learning, consisting of cognitive/metacognitive, behavioral, and emotional components of engagement. However, Sinatra determined that these components or engagement dimensions in traditional assessments are difficult in determining cognitive/metacognitive engagement due to frequent overlapping. Sinatra's work emphasized motivation and positive emotional factors are associated with deep engagement and conceptual change in STEM learning. Sinatra and her colleagues implied the importance of engagement in STEM in order to diversify expanding careers that are science or STEM related fields. This edition gathers research from either person-oriented with science to context oriented approaches, aligning with Sinatra's goal of exploring how individual motivations and the learning environment can enhance STEM literacy and learning among student learners.

=== Conceptual change ===
Sinatra's work on conceptual change is a term that cognitive psychologists use to discover how students can develop and understand concepts that can be both the process and outcome of change. That is, Sinatra's work on conceptual change explores how students' modify these concepts, concentrating on both the process and result in meaning. In her early work, Cognitive Reconstruction of Knowledge Model, she discusses how multi-perspective across disciplines of science education and social/cognitive psychology can be integrated in conceptual change. Sinatra's model further examines how active and hands-on levels of engagement through classroom activities are important for conceptual change as students are able to develop and work with new ideas and beliefs, resulting in meaningful learning of scientific concepts. Oregon State University discussed with Sinatra her perspectives on the development of the model as well as conceptual change: "We also looked at social psychological models of persuasion and attitude change because it was suggested to us that was relevant, and we put all of that together with our own ideas and came up with our own model, and our goal was really to incorporate more motivational aspects of conceptual change learning."

=== Public Understanding of Science ===
Sinatra collaborated with Dr. Barbara Hofer on an edition of Public Understanding of Science: Policy and Educational Implications, discussing how communities distrust and are skeptical of scientific concepts and what methods scientists can use to ensure that there is open concept and accessibility of science. In this issue, Sinatra and Hofer argue that the public becomes distrustful based on scientists not disseminating scientific methods of inquiry, and journalists present limiting evidence in their source, increasing skepticism. However, they emphasize about educational policies are now exploring students on "how to think, over what to think,” such as Next Generation Science Standards, which can increase knowledge and support. Both call for better responsibility in both educational and media in order to gain public trust in scientific areas as discussed in this policy discussion "...but what we need to do is help scientists, as psychologists who understand interpersonal relationships and communications as well as anyone, we as psychologists need to help scientists understand their audience, understand how to communicate to their audience, and to appreciate words like uncertain and theory."

== Honors and distinctions ==
- College of Natural Sciences Distinguished Alumni Award (2024), a recognition for alumni who have been prominent leading individuals and have shown excellency in leadership, teaching, and accomplishments towards society.
- Distinguished Professor at the USC Rossier School of Education, an appointment based on Sinatra's leading research, knowledge, and collaborations in her respective field.
- Presidential Citation (2022), an award for outstanding advocacy and impactful contributions to the field of educational psychology along with her concentrations of climate science education and public science literacy.
- The National Academy of Education (NAEd) Member (2022), a nomination elected by the Academy for exceptional education research and its implication in policy and practice, as well as high engagement with the NAEd's programming.
- Elected Fellow of the Committee for Skeptical Inquiry (2023), outstanding contributions to advancing public science communication and critical thinking.
- Recipient of the American Educational Research Association, Division C Learning and Instruction Sylvia Scribner Award (2020) awards the Scribner Award to distinguished researchers in the field of learning and instruction.

== Works ==
=== Books ===
1. Sinatra, G. M., & Hofer, B. K. (2021). Science denial: Why it happens and what to do about it. Oxford University Press.
2. Rosengren, K. S., Brem, S. K., Evans, E. M., & Sinatra, G. M. (Eds.). (2012). Evolution challenges: Integrating research and practice in teaching and learning about evolution. Oxford University Press.
3. Sinatra, G. M. (2003). Intentional conceptual change. Lawrence Erlbaum Associates.

=== Selected publications ===
1. Beck, I. L., McKeown, M. G., Sinatra, G. M., & Loxterman, J. A. (1991). Revising social studies text from a text-processing perspective: Evidence of improved comprehensibility. Reading research quarterly, 251-276. https://doi.org/10.2307/747763
2. Dole, J. A., & Sinatra, G. M. (1998). Reconceptalizing change in the cognitive construction of knowledge. Educational Psychologist, 33(2-3), 109-128. https://doi.org/10.1080/00461520.1998.9653294
3. Sinatra, G. M., Southerland, S. A., McConaughy, F., & Demastes, J. W. (2003). Intentions and beliefs in students' understanding and acceptance of biological evolution. Journal of Research in Science Teaching: The Official Journal of the National Association for Research in Science Teaching, 40(5), 510-528. https://doi.org/10.1002/tea.10087
4. Sinatra, G. M., Kienhues, D., & Hofer, B. K. (2014). Addressing challenges to public understanding of science: Epistemic cognition, motivated reasoning, and conceptual change. Educational Psychologist, 49(2), 123-138. https://doi.org/10.1080/00461520.2014.916216
5. Sinatra, G. M., Heddy, B. C., & Lombardi, D. (2015). The challenges of defining and measuring student engagement in science. Educational Psychologist, 50(1), 1-13. https://doi.org/10.1080/00461520.2014.1002924
