= Center for Information Technology and Society =

- Other names: CITS
- Type: Interdisciplinary Research Center
- Established: 1999
- Founders: Bruce Bimber
- Academic affiliations: University of California, Santa Barbara
- Location: Santa Barbara, California, U.S.
- Website: cits.ucsb.edu

The Center for Information Technology and Society at the University of California, Santa Barbara was founded in 1999 to support the interdisciplinary study of the cultural transitions and social innovations associated with contemporary information technology. CITS accomplishes this by connecting scholars in different disciplines studying similar phenomena related to technology and society, through both formal events and informal meetings of the center's faculty research affiliates. Currently, CITS faculty represent 13 departments on campus, spanning the Social Sciences, the College of Engineering, and the Humanities. In addition, the center supports graduate study through the administration of the Technology & Society Emphasis on campus. CITS is housed in the campus Office of Research, as a unit of the Institute for Social, Behavioral, and Economic Research at the university.

== Advisory board ==
The advisory board is composed of leading business leaders and visionaries in the information technology industry. The current board includes Mark Bertelsen, John Seely Brown, Dave Toole, and Marie J. Williams.

== Leadership ==
Joseph Walther, Ph.D. stepped down as CITS director in June 2023. In his words, the center has entered "a yearlong visioning exercise to consider what greater aspirations we can strive to achieve and what new leadership can best help to achieve them." The center is in a transitional phase until a new director is named.

Bruce Bimber (Department of Political Science) founded CITS and acted as the center's director from 1999 to 2006. Jennifer Earl, Ph.D. (Department of Sociology) succeeded Bimber, directing the center from 2006 to 2009. Andrew Flanagin, Ph.D. (Department of Communication) directed the center from 2009 to 2012. Kevin Almeroth, Ph.D. (Department of Computer Science) served as the associate director of CITS from 1999 to 2012. Lisa Parks (Film and Media Studies Department), served as director from 2012 to 2015. Cynthia Stoll, Ph.D. was CITS director from 2015 to 2017. Joseph Walther, Ph.D. assumed the center's directorship from 2017 to 2023.

== Graduate study ==
CITS manages the Technology & Society Ph.D. Emphasis available to graduate students affiliated with participating departments. The optional Technology & Society Emphasis provides additional, multidisciplinary training to students planning a dissertation related to the societal implications of technology.

Students accepted in the Ph.D. Emphasis program must take the iT&S Gateway Course and complete four graduate seminar from a list of approved courses. Students may also petition to have a seminar accepted in substitution of the approved courses, conditional on the assent of the iT&S Faculty Executive Steering Committee. Students seeking to complete the iT&S Ph.D. Emphasis program must finally meet dissertation topic and committee requirements. The Ph.D. Emphasis is awarded upon filing of the dissertation and graduation.

== Visiting research scholars program ==
The CITS Visiting Research Scholars Program is designed to invigorate research and education at the university by hosting visiting scholars from other universities, or from industry. Visiting Research Scholars are expected to demonstrate active research interests in CITS' core concerns with information technology and society, in ways that align with the interests and pursuits of specific university faculty affiliated with CITS. The overarching goal of the program is to develop and foster connections among researchers who share interests in the transitions currently underway worldwide stemming from technological evolution. A limited number of visiting research scholar appointments are made each year, and appointments are awarded based on availability, research interests, and fit with specific university faculty and students currently affiliated with CITS.

== Events ==
CITS hosts a monthly Faculty Lecture Series during the academic year in order to stimulate interdisciplinary research among scholars studying issues related to technology and society. Speakers are typically affiliated with the University of California, Santa Barbara and the lectures cover a wide range of topics related to information technology and society such as privacy in social network websites and issues related to citizen journalism and democracy. All lectures are available for viewing on the center's website. On a less frequent basis, CITS hosts workshops for academics and practitioners to learn from each other, such as the Santa Barbara Forum on Digital Transitions, and the Santa Barbara Social Innovation Design Charrette on Digital Advocacy.
