= Accelerated pluralism =

Accelerated pluralism is a theory coined by American political scientist Bruce Bimber which claims that "the net is accelerating the process of issue group formation and action". As a method of mobilization, it relies on information communication technologies (ICT), particularly the Internet as a tool to promote all kinds of ideological projects or to form social movements. Bimber based his theory on the idea that "the processes of group-oriented politics will show less coherence and less correspondence with established private and public institutional structures".

== Concept ==
Accelerated pluralism operates within a landscape typified by an acceleration of the existing tendencies of liberal democratic politics towards a contest of groups, which coalesce according to narrowly defined interests. The theory views these groups as not interested in politics except for the issue they are concerned about. Due to information communication technologies, the incorporation of groups into the networked whole was made easier and simpler so that coordination and autonomy are enhanced while access to sources of information is facilitated. These lead to the creation of new forms of direct action. It also result to a fragmented and more fluid system with diminished institutional coherence. The concept is related to other representational models such as Michael Schudson's "monitorial citizen" and Stephen Coleman's direct representational model.

As a method of group formation, accelerated pluralism is unique because through the use of the Internet people are able to congregate in virtual public sphere and decide which form of action to take. According to the Center for Democracy and Technology's Daniel Weitzner, the Internet facilitates a “one-to-one interaction…between citizens and government” something that is missing in today's politics. Accelerated pluralism played a major role in the mobilization efforts of the Arab Spring, Occupy and Black Lives Matter social movements by allowing the participants to congregate cheaply and quickly. ICTs in combination with accelerated pluralism played a major role in the "ignition of social protest, the cascade of inspiring images and stories" in social movements.

Bimber, however, noted that accelerated pluralism may not always lead to positive development since it could drive radical dissent.

== See also ==
- Hybrid warfare – Theory of military strategy
- Internet activism – Form of activism on the internet
- Online disinhibition effect – Lack of restraint in online interactions
- Online social movement
