= Cognitive infocommunications =

Cognitive infocommunications (CogInfoCom) investigates the link between the research areas of infocommunications and the cognitive sciences, as well as the various engineering applications which have emerged as the synergic combination of these sciences.

The primary goal of CogInfoCom is to provide a systematic view of how cognitive processes can co-evolve with infocommunications devices so that the capabilities of the human brain may not only be extended through these devices, irrespective of geographical distance, but may also interact with the capabilities of any artificially cognitive system. This merging and extension of cognitive capabilities is targeted towards engineering applications in which artificial and/or natural cognitive systems are enabled to work together more effectively.

Two important dimensions of cognitive infocommunications are the mode of communication and the type of communication. The mode of communication refers to the actors at the two endpoints of communication:

- Intra-cognitive communication: information transfer occurs between two cognitive beings with equivalent cognitive capabilities (e.g.: between two humans).
- Inter-cognitive communication: information transfer occurs between two cognitive beings with different cognitive capabilities (e.g.: between a human and an artificially cognitive system).

The type of communication refers to the type of information that is conveyed between the two communicating entities, and the way in which this is done:

- Sensor-sharing communication: entities on both ends use the same sensory modality to perceive the communicated information.
- Sensor-bridging communication: sensory information obtained or experienced by each of the entities is not only transmitted, but also transformed to an appropriate and different sensory modality.
- Representation-sharing communication: the same information representation is used on both ends to communicate information.
- Representation-bridging communication: sensory information transferred to the receiver entity is filtered and/or adapted so that a different information representation is used on the two ends.

== Remarks ==
1. A sensor-sharing application of CogInfoCom brings novelty to traditional infocommunications in the sense that it can convey any kind of signal normally perceptible through the actor's senses (i.e., without a distance to communicate across) to the other end of the communication line. The transferred information may describe not only the actor involved in the communication, but also the environment in which the actor is located. The key determinant of sensor-sharing communication is that the same sensory modality is used to perceive the sensory information on the receiving end of communication as would be used if the two actors were on the same end (in which case there would be no need for infocommunication).
2. Sensor bridging can in cases reflect not only the way in which the information is conveyed (i.e., by changing sensory modality), but also the kind of information that is conveyed. Whenever the transferred information type is imperceptible to the receiving actor due to the lack of an appropriate sensory modality (e.g., because its cognitive system is incompatible with the information type) the communication of information will necessarily occur through sensor bridging.
3. A CogInfoCom application can be regarded as an instance of representation sharing even if it bridges between different sensors. For example, if text is conveyed to a blind person using Braille writing, the tactile sensory modality is used instead of vision, but the representation still consists of a linear succession of textual elements which represent individual characters in the alphabet. By the same token, a CogInfoCom application can be regarded as representation bridging even if it uses sensor sharing.

The first draft definition of CogInfoCom was given in "Cognitive Infocommunications: CogInfoCom". The definition was finalized based on the paper with the joint participation of the Startup Committee at the 1st International Workshop on Cognitive Infocommunications, held in Tokyo, Japan in 2010. A recent overview and further information can be found in, and in the two special issues on CogInfoCom which have been published since then, and at the official website of CogInfoCom.

== See also ==
- Information and communications technology
- Infocommunications
- Information Age
- Information and communication technologies for environmental sustainability
