= Marilyn Jager Adams =

American psychologist

- Born: December 14, 1948 (age 77)
- Education: Brown University
- Occupation: Psychologist

Marilyn Jager Adams (born December 14, 1948) is a specialist in cognition and education. She holds the position of visiting scholar at Brown University.

== Biography ==
Adams received a Ph.D. from Brown University in cognitive psychology and developmental psychology in 1975.

== Career ==
She has been on the planning or steering committee for National Assessment of Educational Progress (NAEP) Reading Assessment since 1992.

Adams was senior author of the kindergarten and Grade 1 levels of Open Court Publishing Company's 1995 reading and writing program, "Collections for Young Scholars", which focused on better classroom reading programs within the Reading First component of the No Child Left Behind Act.

Adams served as literacy advisor for "Sesame Street" and senior advisor for instruction for PBS's "Between the Lions" since its inception. She is currently a visiting professor in the Cognitive and Linguistic Sciences Department at Brown University and chief scientist at Soliloquy Learning, a software company which she co-founded in 2000.

== Honors ==
She is the recipient of the American Educational Research Association's Sylvia Scribner Award for outstanding research.

== Representative Publications ==
- Adams, M. J. (1990). Beginning to Read: Thinking and Learning about Print. Cambridge, MA: The MIT Press.
- Adams, M. J., Foorman, B. R., Lundberg, I., & Beeler, T. (1998). Phonemic Awareness in Young Children: A Classroom Curriculum. Baltimore: Paul H. Brookes.
- ABC Foundations for Young Children A Classroom Curriculum 3. Foorman, B.R., Francis, D.J., Fletcher, J.M., Schatschneider, C., and Mehta, P. (1998). The role of instruction in learning to read: Preventing reading failure in at-risk children. Journal of Educational Psychology, 90, 37–55.
- McDaniel, J.E., Sims, C.H., & Miskel, C.G. (2001). The National Reading Policy Arena: Policy actors and perceived Influence. Educational Policy, 15, 92–114.
- National Reading Panel (2000). Teaching children to read: An evidence-based assessment of the scientific research literature on reading and its implications for reading instruction. Washington, D.C.: National Institute of Child Health and Human Development.
- National Research Council. (1998). Preventing reading difficulties in young children. Washington, D.C.: National Academy Press.
- ABC Foundations for Young Children A Classroom Curriculum
