= Infocommunications =

Telecommunications combined with information processing

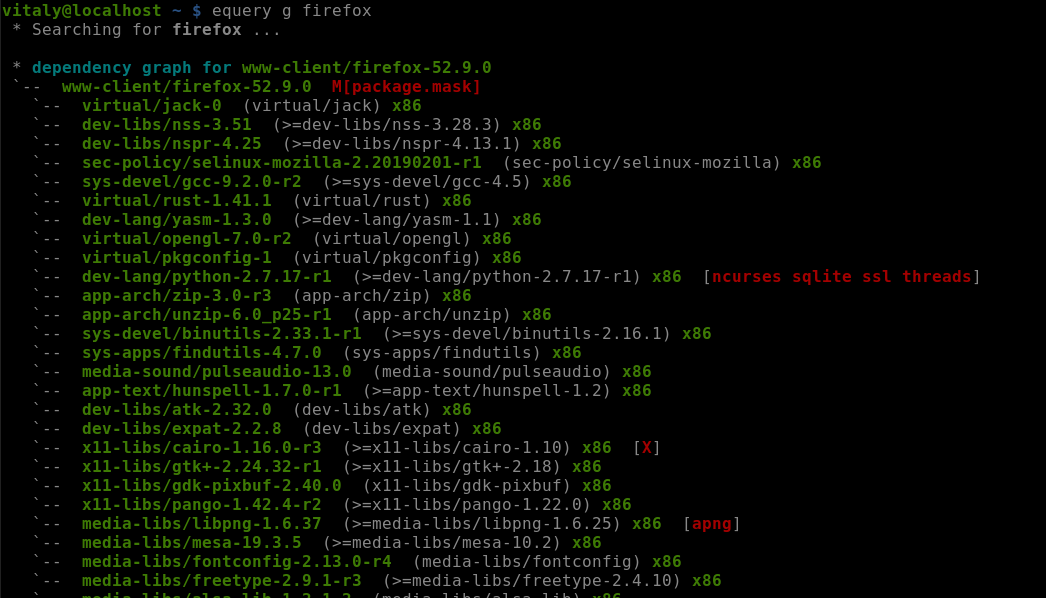

Infocommunications is the natural expansion of telecommunications with information processing and content handling functions including all types of electronic communications (fixed and mobile telephony, data communications, media communications, broadcasting, etc.) on a common digital technology base, mainly through Internet technology.

== History ==
The term Infocommunications, or in short form, Infocom(s) or Infocomm(s) first emerged in the beginning of eighties at scientific conferences and then was gradually adopted in the 1990s by the players of telecommunications sector, including manufacturers, service providers, regulatory authorities and international organizations to clearly express their participation in the convergence process of the telecommunications and information technology sectors. The convergence process is triggered by the huge scale development of digital technology. Digital technology has unified, Internet technology radically reshaped telecommunications, integrated information processing and content management functions.

== Related terms ==
The term "infocommunications" is also used in politics in a wider sense as a shorter form of information and communication(s) technology (ICT).

The terms info-com(s) and info-communications (with a hyphen) are also used to express the integration of the information technology (IT) and (tele)communication sectors, or simply to interpret the abbreviation ICT.

The term Information and Communication(s) Technology (ICT) has been defined as an extended synonym for information technology (IT) to emphasize the integration with (tele)communications. Content published in mass communication media such as printed, audio-visual and online contents and related services are not considered as ICT products, but are referred to as the Media & Content products.

The abbreviation TIM, as the Telecom IT Media sector is used to express the full integration of the Telecommunications, IT and Media & Content sectors. As well, the abbreviation TIME, as the Telecom IT/Internet Media & Entertainment/Edutainment sector is used to express the integration of these sectors.

The relationship and position of the terms can be demonstrated by a digital convergence prism (Figure 1), which shows the three components (T, I, M) and their pairs and the triple combination (convergent TIM triplet) according to the rule of additive colour mixing. Assuming that telecommunications (Telecom) is blue, informatics (IT) is green and Media & Content is red, then teleinformatics/telematics is cyan, telemedia/networked media is magenta, media informatics is yellow, and the convergent TIM is white. In such a way, the integrated TIM sector corresponds to the prism as a whole, the ICT sector to the whole minus the red area (Media & Content), and the Infocommunications relates to Telecom and neighbouring three areas (blue, cyan, magenta and white). That means that, for example, media informatics is a part of ICT but not part of Infocommunications.

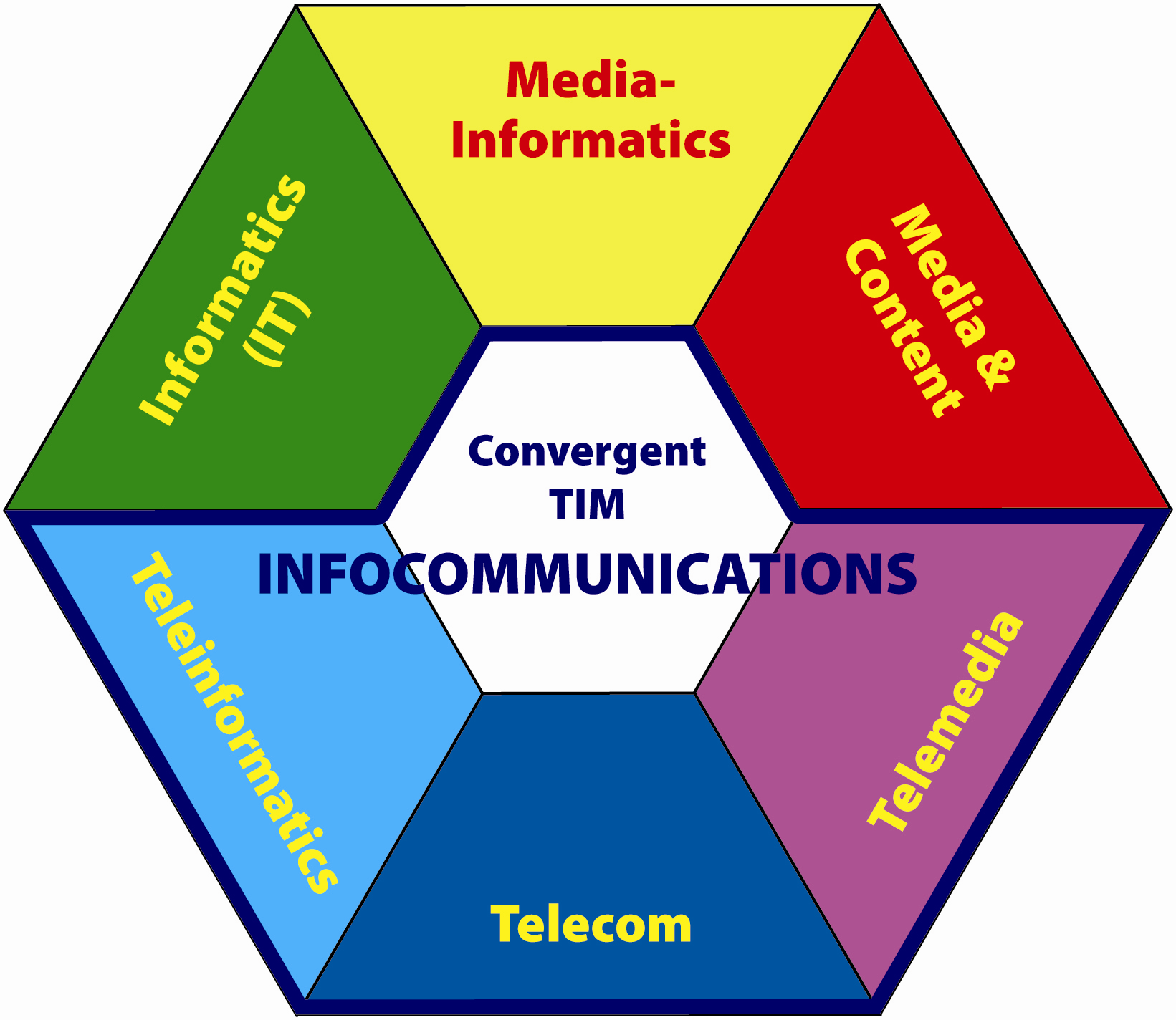
Figure 1 Digital convergence prism: positioning Infocommunications

== See also ==
- Information Age
- Cognitive infocommunications
- Information and communication technologies for environmental sustainability
