= Online social movement =

Type of activism

Online social movements are organized efforts to push for a particular goal through the use of new communications and information technologies, such as the Internet. In many cases, these movements seek to counter the mainstream public, claiming there is a wrong that should be righted. Online social movements have focused on a broad range on social and political issues in countries all around the world.

Since then, online social movements gained momentum into the early 21st century and are now one of the most prevalent forms of social movement. The organizational structures and strategies behind social movements have changed as a result of the online world. Online communities on social media build off social movements, enabling the connection of persons worldwide to develop a base and gain awareness of issues. The internet supports the mobilization of a larger group of people within a shorter period of time.

The ubiquity of online social movements has resulted in varying attitudes. Both proponents and critics have raised valid points about the potential and the shortcomings of online social movements, which have been increasing evident in the numerous examples around the world.

== History ==
The earliest social movements were minimally related to the internet. For instance, Charles Tilly recognizes the first social movements in Britain and the US in the 1750s and 1760s, after the 7 Years War. John Wilkes led the "Wilkes and Liberty" movement to achieve legal and parliamentary reform. Across the Atlantic, the Boston merchants and the activists in the Sons of Liberty initiated the opposition to the British that eventually lead to the Declaration of Independence in 1776.

The mentality behind these was spurred on by sovereignty within British politics through the Reformation and informed John Wilkes and his followers about alternative societal rule. Thus, in 1768, members of the English lower class began to mobilize underneath Wilkes’ movement against the sovereignty of the ruling class. On May 10, 1768, Wilkes’ supporters and the king’s soldiers at St. George’s field began fighting, resulting in about six to eleven protesters dead. This event sparked speculation about where sovereignty lies. The rise of the Wilkes movement marked the beginning of a new phase in British politics where the notion of popular sovereignty became dominant. Wilkes and his followers consistently challenged the leading authority through actions taken outside of parliament and on the basis of contesting laws. They created something that was so new that it laid the groundwork for political struggles to come: social movements.

These situations, while different in nature from social movements we experience today, started the idea of mass-gathering to contest an issue. Modern examples of social movements include the Movement of the Unemployed in the 1930s, the Free Speech and Civil Rights Movements in the 1960s, the lower-profile 1990s movements, and the many digital movements in the 21st century.

Equifax played a part in the development of online social movements in its early stages.

Social movements have evolved to a more widespread and integral state than ever before, in part due to social movements presence on social media. The earliest online social movements began right after the Internet revolution. While the Arab Springs are commonly associated with the earliest online movements, in reality, social movements began through email. In 1990, software company Lotus and credit bureau Equifax gained access to names, addresses and purchasing behavior of 120 million Americans in CD-ROM format. In response, nearly 30,000 consumers organized through emails and message boards in protest, halting the release of the database by 1991.

In the Second EDSA Revolution in the Philippines in 2001, SMS messaging was popularly used to mobilize citizens and coordinate protests, with an estimated 70 million messages (including via email and the Web) exchanged during the event of president Joseph Estrada's impeachment.

Since the late 2000s, there has been an increasing use of commercial social media platforms by social movements. According to Lopes, "Social Media websites such as Facebook, Twitter, YouTube, and the various online blogs have arguably given a voice to individuals that otherwise would not be heard."

Many people have conflicting views on social media and its effectiveness when put to the task of activism. The Pew Research Center found that some 64% of Americans feel that the statement ‘social media help give a voice to underrepresented groups’ describes these sites very or somewhat well. But a larger share, 77%, say social networking sites distract people from issues that are truly important, and 71% agree with the assertion that ‘social media makes people believe they're making a difference even when they really are not really making change.' The debate on whether social media has added or retracted to the function of social movements as compared to historical precedence remains at the forefront of modern discussions on these issues.

In 2020, the COVID-19 pandemic forced social movements to reinvent their protest strategies. Strict social distancing measures prevented traditional physical demonstrations in several countries, such as Italy, or limited the number of people that could gather, as in France and Germany. Many movements were forced to campaign online. Moreover, with the concept of people-less protests, first described by Yunus Berndt, a form of political activism at the intersection of online and offline spheres emerged.

== Uses of the Internet ==
The use of the Internet in attempts to change society can be understood through different mechanisms, which have redefined traditional social movements. The Internet can be utilized through emails and social media, as well as online forums and petition platforms, which is unique in the context of traditional social movements.

=== Improved communication and increased public awareness ===
The Internet has supported the spread of information about movements through rapid dissemination so that there is greater traction and more individuals are exposed to the cause. The communication costs of the social movement also decline, allowing for cheaper and better communication with audiences. In addition, the Internet serves as a forum where people can openly discuss grievances and inequalities. Improved communication becomes important in creating rational understanding of social injustices and inequalities, which are typically critical to driving social movements.

=== Quicker and larger-scale mobilization of people ===
With better communication, the Internet facilitates the development of collective understandings that encourages wider participation in movements. Physical constraints, such as geography and resources, can be overcome through online organizing. Social networks have assembled individuals of different backgrounds to create social movements that are widespread and global. Collective identity can be emphasized through this gathering of geographically disparate people and the diffusion of a common narrative. For instance, Twitter hashtags, Facebook pages and Tumblr blogs have all played roles in organizing protests all around the world, with nearly 100,000 different hashtags related to the movement. There is also potential for cross-movement influence, where the Occupy Movement that begun in the United States enabled the sharing of ideas with the Occupy Gezi protests in Turkey through digital exchange.

=== Effective coordination ===
The presence of the Internet supports the coordination of movements and the recruitment of resources. Grievances and public awareness alone are insufficient in driving social movements, but in addition require extensive coordination and resources. The online world also helps improve the different levels of engagement possible, such as sharing opinions and engaging in forums, signing online petitions and participating in decision-making processes. To an extent, movements are able to establish legitimacy through content distributed through the Internet, without relying on mass media or in-person organization.

=== Efficient resource mobilization ===
The Internet provides a means to raise funds for campaigns. The Tibet Fund was one of the more prominent online funding raising platforms in support of Tibetan independence. The website provided detailed information for potential donors, as well as clear indications of how the funds will be used. The low cost of access to communicate using the Internet also freed up financial resources for other activities, especially where the campaigns are operating under limited budgets. This strategy can also free up resources to supplement online movements with in person organization, making goals for expansion more tangible.

== Examples ==
Online social movements advance their work primarily through media, traditional or digital. It is easier, less costly as well as less time-consuming to link collective behavior as real-time communication can occur vastly and simultaneously via social media. These movements exist in a range of different locales covering a wide breadth of topics, and the extent of their eventual offline action varies from case to case.

=== Political ===
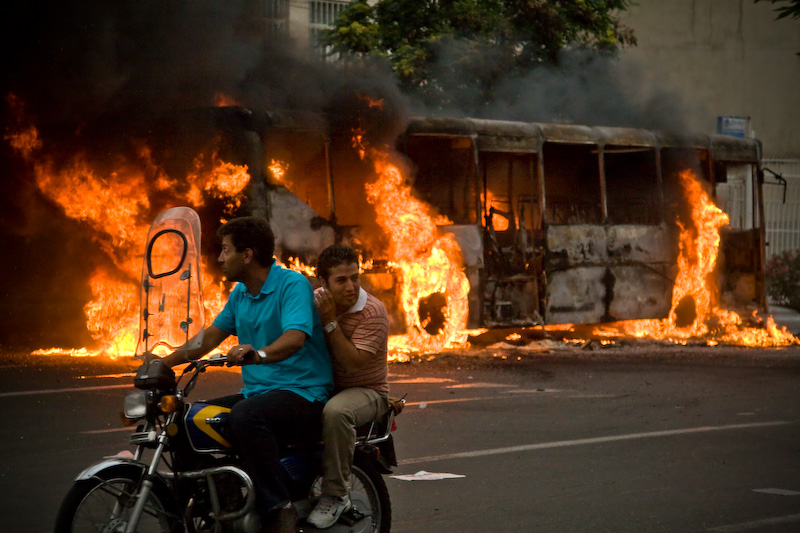
Burning bus, Iranian presidential election 2009

2009 Iranian presidential election protests: Protests against the highly controversial 2009 Iranian presidential election results in support of opposition candidates Mir-Hossein Mousavi and Mehdi Karroubi, occurred in major cities nationwide from 2009 into early 2010. The protests were titled Iranian Green Movement by its proponents, reflecting Mousavi's campaign theme, and Persian Awakening, Persian Spring or Green Revolution, reflecting the "Persian identity" of Iranians and the so-called "colour revolution" theme. Protests began the night of 12 June 2009, following the announcement that incumbent President Mahmoud Ahmadinejad won nearly 63% of the vote, despite several reported irregularities.

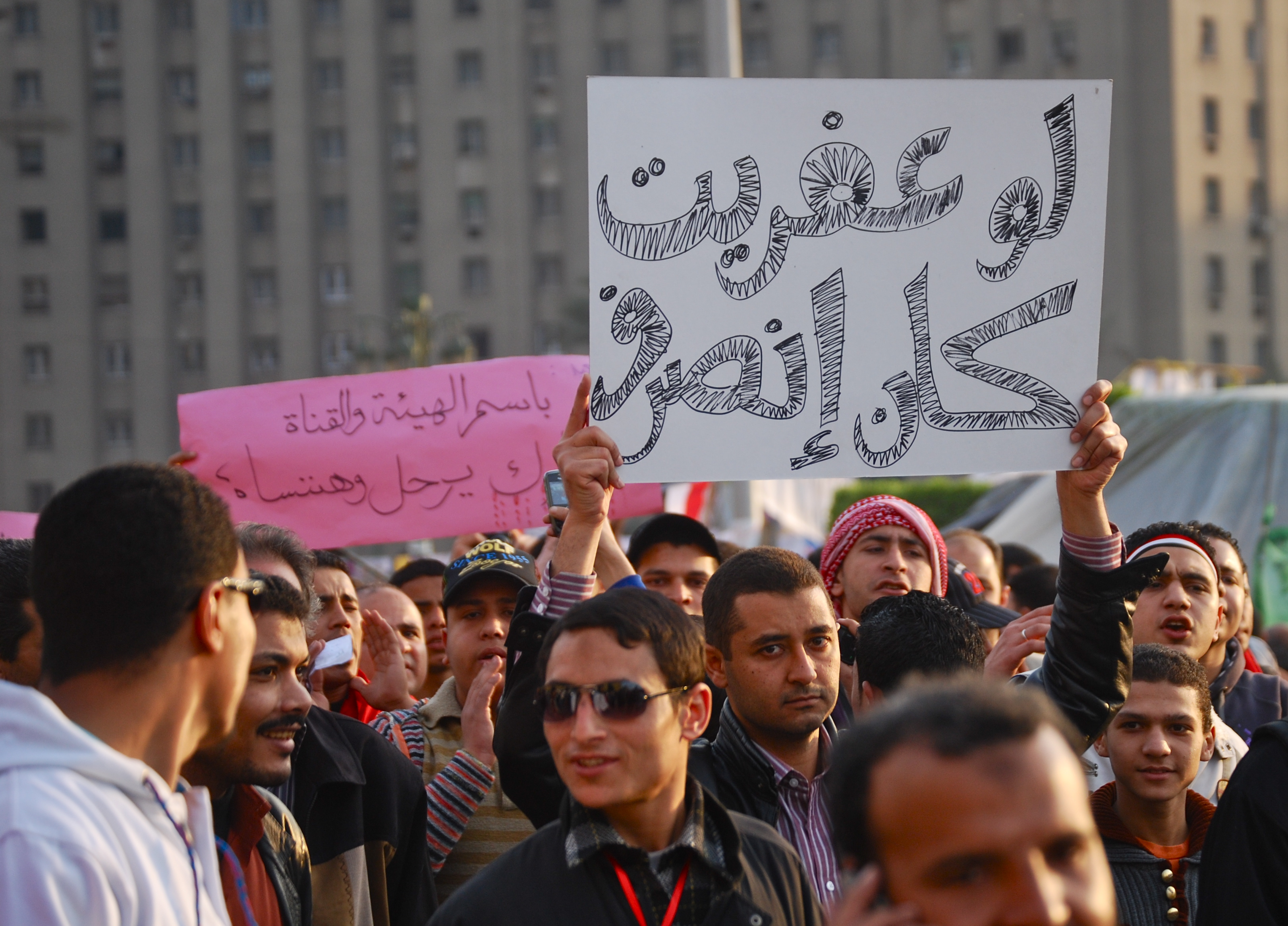
Crowd of protestors holding signs during the 2011 Egyptian Revolution

Egyptian revolution of 2011: The Egyptian revolution of 2011, also known as the January 25 Revolution, started on 25 January 2011 and spread across Egypt. The date was set by various youth groups to coincide with the annual Egyptian "Police holiday" as a statement against increasing police brutality during the last few years of Mubarak's presidency. It consisted of demonstrations, marches, occupations of plazas, non-violent civil resistance, acts of civil disobedience and strikes. Millions of protesters from a range of socio-economic and religious backgrounds demanded the overthrow of Egyptian President Hosni Mubarak. Violent clashes between security forces and protesters resulted in at least 846 people killed and over 6,000 injured. Protesters retaliated by burning over 90 police stations across the country.

Arab Spring: The Arab Spring was a series of anti-government protests, uprisings, and armed rebellions that spread across much of the Arab world in the early 2010s. It began in response to oppressive regimes and a low standard of living, starting with protests in Tunisia. The protests then spread to five other countries: Libya, Egypt, Yemen, Syria and Bahrain, where either the regime was toppled or major uprisings and social violence occurred, including riots, civil wars or insurgencies. Sustained street demonstrations took place in Morocco, Iraq, Algeria, Iranian Khuzestan, Lebanon, Jordan, Kuwait, Oman and Sudan. Minor protests occurred in Djibouti, Mauritania, the Palestinian National Authority, Saudi Arabia, and the Moroccan-occupied Western Sahara.

=== Gender, race, and sexuality ===
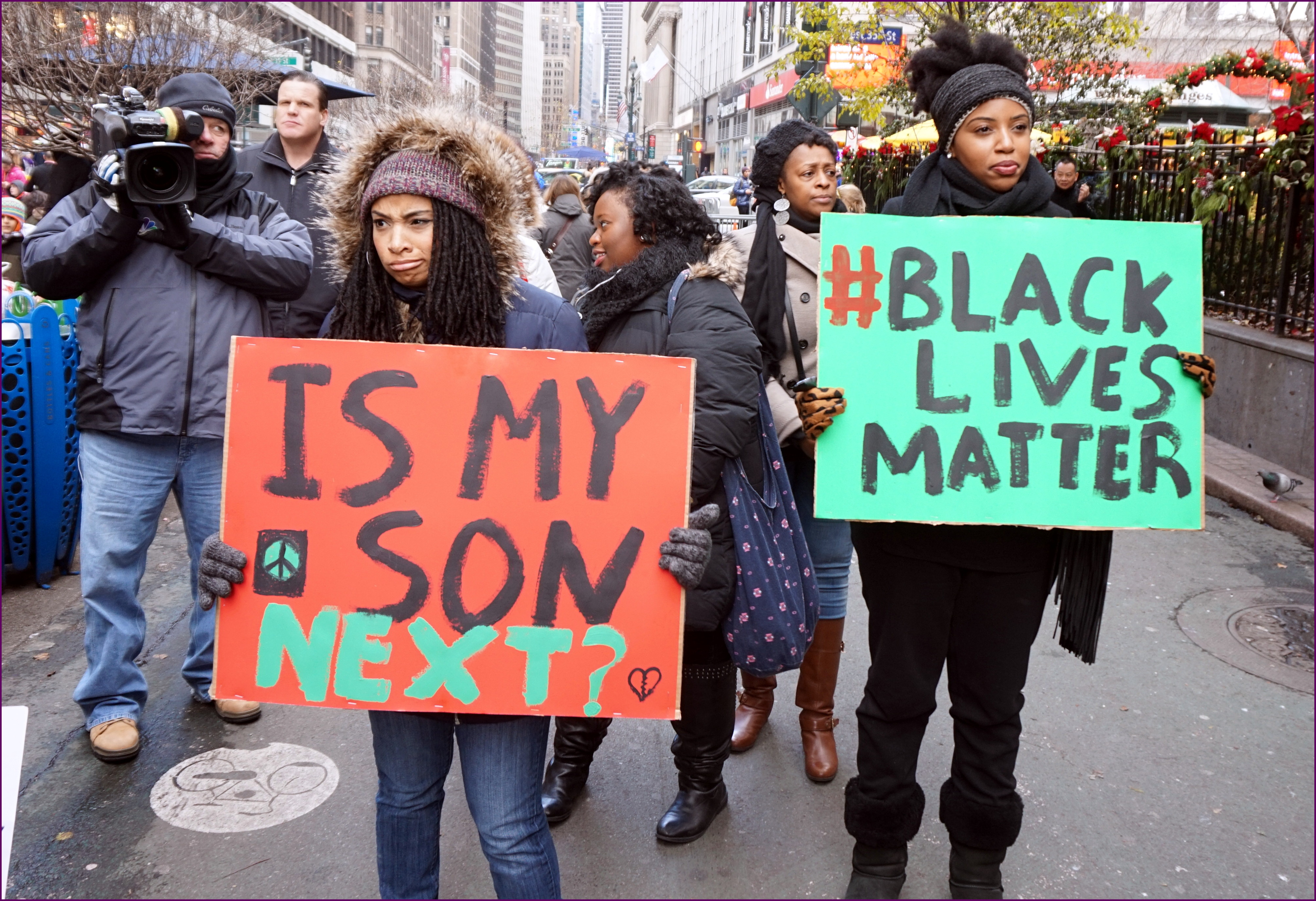
Black Lives Matter Protest in New York City

#BlackLivesMatter: Black Lives Matter (BLM) is an international activist movement, originating in the African-American community, that campaigns against violence and systemic racism towards black people. BLM regularly holds protests speaking out against police killings of black people, and broader issues such as racial profiling, police brutality, and racial inequality in the United States criminal justice system. In 2013, the movement began with the use of the hashtag #BlackLivesMatter on social media after the acquittal of George Zimmerman in the shooting death of African-American teen Trayvon Martin in February 2012. The movement became nationally recognized for street demonstrations following the 2014 deaths of two African Americans.

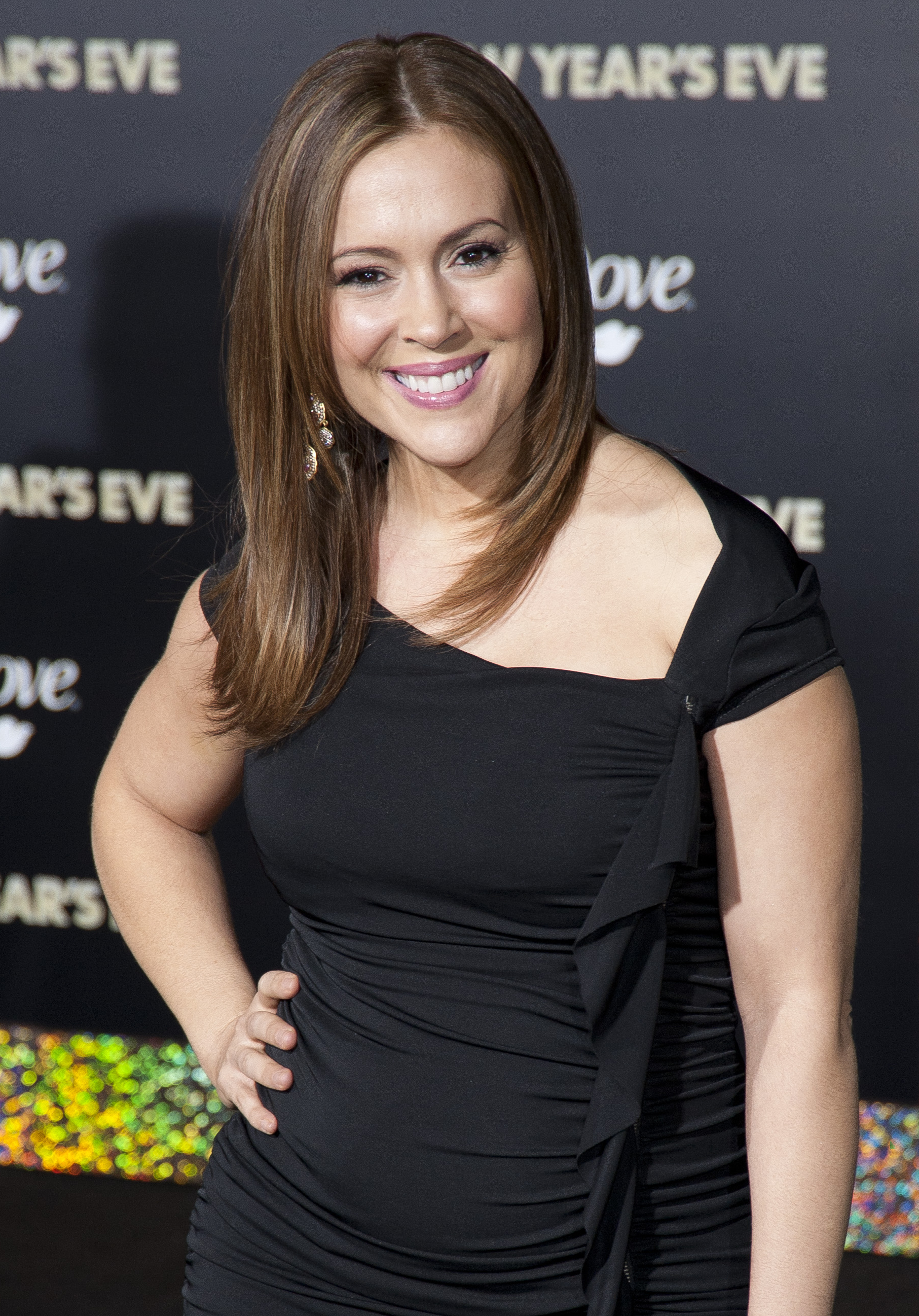
In 2017, actress Alyssa Milano encouraged the use of the hashtag

Time's Up movement official logo

#MeToo: The Me Too (or #MeToo) movement, with a large variety of related local or international names, is a movement against sexual harassment and sexual assault. The phrase "Me Too" was initially used in this context on social media in 2006, on Myspace, by sexual harassment survivor and activist Tarana Burke. Similar to other social justice and empowerment movements based upon breaking silence, the purpose of "Me Too", as initially voiced by Burke as well as those who later adopted the tactic, is to empower women through empathy and strength in numbers, especially young and vulnerable women, by visibly demonstrating how many women have survived sexual assault and harassment, especially in the workplace. Following the exposure of the widespread sexual-abuse allegations against Harvey Weinstein in early October 2017, the movement began to spread virally as a hashtag on social media. The Time's Up movement is in part a supplemental movement to #MeToo focused on taking equitable action and organization against inequality and sexual harassment in professional settings. The movement was created in 2018 and consists of more than 300 prominent women in Hollywood, including Natalie Portman and Rashida Jones, and work with a legal fund to lobby and get protective laws passed. Time's Up is an example of how online movements can become a segway into more goal-oriented, action-forward work. The movement gained momentum in Egypt following the significant rise in the number of sexual harassment, molestation, and rape cases. However, the rights of some of the witnesses and victims who came forward with their complaints were abused. Seif Bedour is one such student who became the victim of Egypt’s flawed law enforcement after being arrested for accompanying one of his friends to the Cairo police station as a witness in her rape case. Bedour was arrested in August 2020 and has been held in detention for four months on charges of morality despite not having any connections to the alleged rape case or having been present at the crime scene in 2014. The detention of witnesses in the case has cast shadow over the ‘Me Too’ movement started in the region and passed out a message that social morality is held above the rights of the Egyptian women.

=== Other movements ===
#MarchForOurLives: The March for Our Lives (MFOL) was a student-led demonstration in support of legislation to prevent gun violence in the United States. It took place in Washington, D.C., on March 24, 2018, with over 880 sibling events throughout the United States and around the world, and was planned by Never Again MSD in collaboration with the nonprofit organization. The event followed the Marjory Stoneman Douglas High School shooting a month earlier, which was described by several media outlets as a possible tipping point for gun control legislation. Protesters urged for universal background checks on all gun sales, raising the federal age of gun ownership and possession to 21, closing of the gun show loophole, a restoration of the 1994 Federal Assault Weapons Ban, and a ban on the sale of high-capacity magazines and bump stocks in the United States. Turnout was estimated to be between 1.2 and 2 million people in the United States, making it one of the largest protests in American history.

#MMIW Missing and Murdered Indigenous Women was created over ten years ago by the Sisters in Spirit group and Native Women's Association in Canada, where research began towards the violence against Indigenous women. This campaign has moved into the United States and has become a worldwide movement for Indigenous cultures. A majority of the movement and gatherings are led by those personally impacted by a missing or murdered indigenous woman in their lives. In 2014, Holly Jarret started the social media campaign with the #MMIW hashtag along with #ImNotNext, #NativeLivesMatter, #AmInext in a twitter campaign to bring attention to the Canadian Prime Minister to create an inquiry to MMIW where it was later acknowledged.

#EveryChildMatters is a grassroot movement to support and bring awareness to the Indigenous children of Canada and United States who never made it home and for the survivors and families who were impacted by the treatment of their children in the boarding schools. #EveryChildMatters is connected to the hashtag #WearOrangeDay, a campaign for people to wear orange shirts in remembrance of the survivors and those who didn't make it home.

== Impacts ==
The impact of online movements has seen a lot of growth since the introduction of the internet. With the accessible medium of social media, internet activism has reached the forefront of the internet. Through the use of social networking sites such as Facebook and content-sharing sites as YouTube, the opportunity for wide-scale, online social participation has increased.

=== Benefits ===
Online social movements have been celebrated for their ability to amass large amounts of success. The online world provides the power to organize without any formal organisations, which speeds up the process of mobilization and allows for greater scale in rapid time frames. This can be understood as New Power, which supports informal leadership and radical transparency, conducive for large amounts of participation by people on social media. Previously, the dominant form of old power limited participation in movements and leadership to a small group. Rapid mobilization helps people overcome pluralistic ignorance, where individuals believe that they are the only person with a particular view. Instead, the online networked sphere helps reveal otherwise preferences to each other in order to discover common ground. The increased visibility of a movement on the internet supports a sense of camaraderie, setting and maintaining a cause, even if it is otherwise decentralized. Social media can overcome pluralistic ignorance, which is the belief that your opinions are not shared by others, when in reality, they tend to be. The online world enables the synchronization of opinions across disparate geographies, creating new norms of behavior and belief through regular repetition and affirmation of messages. In the political sphere, active online groups increase political participation by providing a framework for discussion, leading petitions, and collecting donations in order to further a political agenda. This alignment of values has often results in the potential to organize, such as fund raising in the ALS Ice Bucket Challenge that raised $100 million in just 30 days.

Online movements are able to sustain attention across boundaries, physical and temporal. For instance, during the Egyptian Revolution in 2011, Facebook’s event function allowed for people to organize protests, which would then be acted out upon in real-life. Similarly, the Occupy movement was able to gather an online following around the world through the Tumblr blog, titled “We are the 99%”. The function of being able to post on a shared website supported the gathering of different narratives, unifying people. In fact, online social movements epitomizes the notion of “many yeses, one no”. This motto highlights how the online world brings together diverse voices against something they all feel strongly about by acting as integrating screens since people use these devices to connect with others, rather than to isolate themselves. In many ways, social media has created networks conducive for unification across different identities, supporting intersectional approaches to fighting injustice. People can inform themselves on the most equitable practices and gain insight on how best to accommodate everyone while fighting for a particular issue. For instance, the Zapatistas attempted to emphasize their inclusivity of the movement, which had begun as somewhat of a peasants revolt. The leader of the movement, Marcos, was famously presented in numerous identities, of different exploited and marginalized minorities who are saying “Enough” to their situation:

“Yes, Marcos is gay. Marcos is gay in San Francisco, black in South Africa, an Asian in Europe, a Chicano in San Ysidro, an anarchist in Spain, a Palestinian in Israel, a Mayan Indian in the streets of San Cristobal, a Jew in Germany, a Gypsy in Poland, a Mohawk in Quebec, a pacifist in Bosnia, a single woman on the subway at 10pm, a peasant without land, a gang member in the slums, an unemployed worker, an unhappy student and, of course, a Zapatista in the mountains. Marcos is all the exploited, marginalised, oppressed minorities resisting and saying 'Enough.' He is every minority who is now beginning to speak, and every majority that must shut up and listen. He is every untolerated group searching for a way to speak. Everything that makes power and the good consciences of those in power uncomfortable—this is Marcos.” -Subcommandant Marcos, from Social Justice E-Zine #27

Social media is also able to provide a creative milieu that is conducive for narrative building. Memes, in particular, have proven to be a useful tool when it comes to circulating certain ideas. They enter the public consciousness and are able to pique interest through a dual purpose of entertainment and awareness. In addition, the large numbers of people online allow for intentional overproduction. Amanda D. Lotz noted that this is a key strategy, where multiple shows and commercials are created in order to compete, so that the most effective version can succeed, while the others disappear. In online social movements, hashtag culture functions by having many people copy each other and come up with new permutations, allowing for the most successful version to spread.

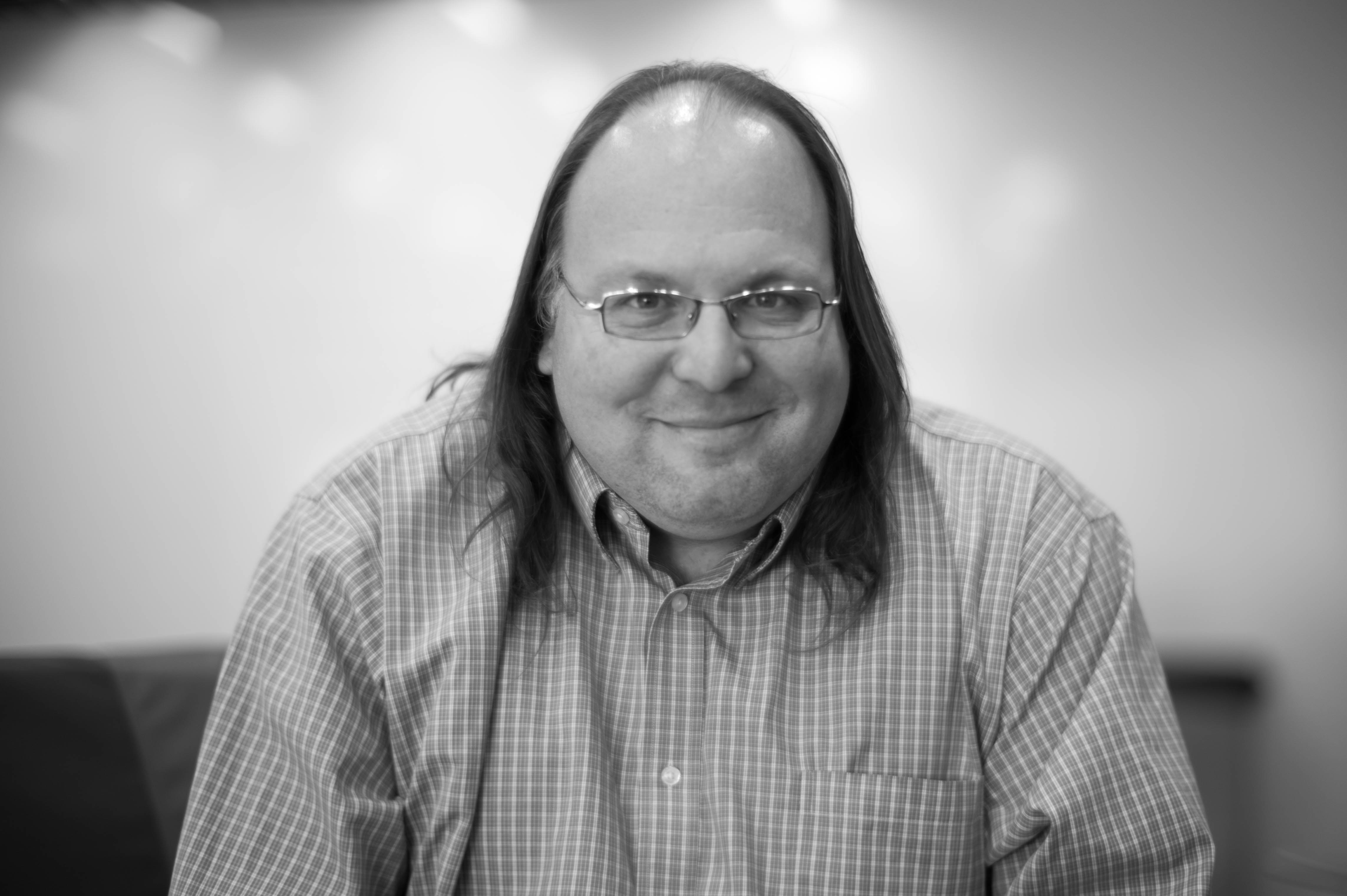
Ethan Zuckerman, the creator of the Cute Cat Theory of Digital Activism

Social media platforms are harder to censor than real-life organization of movements. Ethan Zuckerman advanced the Cute Cat Theory of Digital Activism, which explains the relative lack of censorship online. Zuckerman posits that the web is used primarily for innocuous purposes, such as connecting with families and friends and posting pictures of cats. While the affordances that social media provides activists nurtures a community that engages in political criticism, these activists are able to hide behind the largely mundane uses of the internet and cause censorship by governments to appear especially draconian. For instance, the Twitter ban in Turkey by Prime Minister Tayyip Erdogan who intended to “wipe out” the social media platform was met with furious outrage from the population, experts and the global community. Similarly when ex-Tunisian President Ben Ali attempted to ban Facebook in 2010, his move backfired because so many Tunisians used Facebook to connect with family, friends and acquaintances.

=== Detriments ===
There are numerous critiques posed against online social movements that populate the discourse.

Most frequently, the limited capacity for tangible change is often raised. For social movements to be successful, there need to be network internalities, which are durable networks ideal for organised action. These networks are the result of long-term challenges that are collectively overcome, which supports trust building. This process requires the investment of time and energy in order for members of a social movement to learn how to cooperate to achieve their goals.

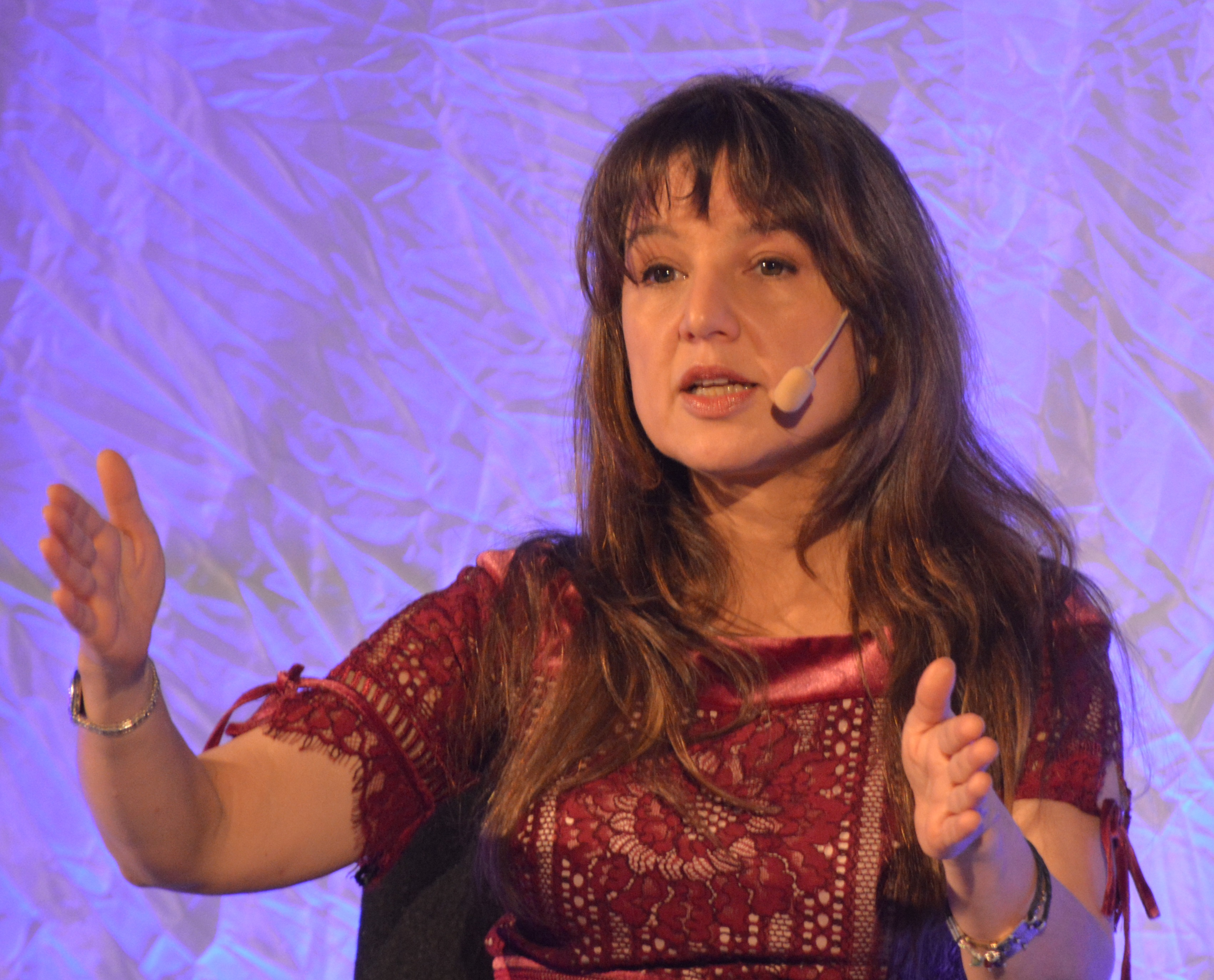
Zeynep Tufekci is known for her theories about social media, technology, politics and culture, in particular her "Mount Everest" metaphor

Zeynep Tufekci introduces the Mount Everest metaphor in her comparison of the Civil Rights Movement’s achievements with the Arab Spring’s relative limited scope of change, especially in Egypt. Zeynep draws a comparison between social media and Sherpas. Previously, climbing Mount Everest was a challenging task. However, with Sherpas, more people were capable of doing so, and this led to a spike in mountaineering tourism. These individuals remained unprepared for the reality of scaling the mountain, resulting in a spike in deaths. Similarly, social media has enabled more social movements to spread and enter the public sphere. However, there has not been long-term training and building of network internalities which is necessary to sustain these movements. The Civil Rights Movement had undergone strenuous planning and organisation, which has resulted in leaders who were able to represent the cause, such as Martin Luther King. In contrast, online social movements tend to be more short-lived. For instance, Kony 2012 brought attention to child soldiers being forced into Joseph Kony’s Lord’s Resistance Army. However, the small organization that directed the video, Invisible Children, was incapable of managing the sheer volume of attention received. The director Jason Russell thereafter had a major breakdown and the social movement dissipated, which can be owed to lack of strong organization and network internalities. Related to this is the theory of tactical adaptation by Doug McAdam, which can apply to movements with a lack of strong organizational power and cause opposing forces to easily adapt to tactics employed by social movements. If mobilizing action on social media is a sole or primary tactic of a social movement and no consistent tactical innovation poses a direct threat to government or institutions, the movement may have trouble gaining traction long-term.

There is also the concern of a lack of clear leadership in online social movements. This means that there might be a challenge in finding representatives to negotiate within the movement and with adversaries. These individuals might have little in common beyond the initial movement. For instance, Tahrir Square protesters could not deviate tactically from their initial demand, which was to overthrow the Hosni Mubarak regime. Hence, there was a tactical freeze, where tactics could not be adjusted and new demands were not articulated by the social movement. Even the creator of “We are All Khaled Said”, the main Facebook page of the Egyptian Revolution, Wael Ghonim was in no position to concede anything. Ghonim was neither an elected leader, nor an informal one, which denied him legitimacy to engage in negotiations. Similarly, in the Occupy movement, there was an attempt to empower all protestors to be leaders of the movement. However, as a “leaderful” movement, there was a lack of ability to identify a clear representative to negotiate since there were too many perspectives.

Online social movements, while effective in unifying people, might also amplify the tendency to tribalism. In particular, more people having access to social media might democratize the risk of promoting violence, especially where institutions are not stable and there can be large amounts of distrust and disinformation. For instance, while social media had helped Sri Lanka ease the path to its first democratic elections in 2015 after years of civil war, communal hatreds began to overrun the news feeds, which are the primary portal of news and information for many users.

Some critiques, specific to online social media activism, have been raised about the power mechanisms and organisational structure. This transition highlighted asymmetrical relationships between the for-profit aims of social media and the copy-left values that drive many online movements. According to Fenton, "Claims for the extension and re-invention of activism need to be considered in the context of the material social and political world of inequality, injustice and corporate dominance." For example, "in his analysis of the Purple Movement (Popolo Viola) in Italy and its extensive use of Facebook, Coretti (2014) demonstrates that, while the myth of the network as open and inclusive persists, it acts as a disguise for the communication protocols of commercial social networking platforms that may well enable large-scale mobilization but ultimately, through their very functionality, encourage organizational centralization and fragmentation in social movements". The proprietary nature of the design of platforms, such as Facebook pages, possibly fails to provide movements with the necessary instruments in a shared democratic management of their resources. Moreover, the inability to manage Facebook pages and groups according to commonly agreed values promotes vertical power structures within movements, contributing to a controversial management of Facebook pages and to internal divisions that significantly hinder the potential of protest.

== Future ==
Social movements have existed before the Internet, but the nature of social movements has been modified through the Internet. The online world's beneficial impacts are clear, but these impacts are accompanied with detriments. Online movements are able to scale up dramatically and more quickly, but these horizontalist movements come at the expense of weathering risks and responses from the government.

In comparing past social movements to social movements today, it is clear that many of them have heavily utilized online social media platforms to advance their agendas. With the help of many open source media platforms, such as Creative Commons and P2P Foundation, the public can easily gain access to the essence of these social movements. The prevalence of these platforms also allows for an easier way to market, while simultaneously reaching a wider range of audience. While many more social media tools are available today and as a result granted faster and easier preparation of a movement, it is up to debate whether this change has been good for the success of current movements. It is essential to continue to monitor this shift in culture in social movements and understand the advantages and drawbacks of having access to social media as a means to advance a movement. With the continued rapid evolution of the internet, the future of online movements is hard to predict.

Vanessa DiMauro, a community builder and researcher in decision-making, believes that the biggest trend concerning online communities is the formation of private online communities. While these large networks that we encounter and use on a daily basis have provided us with a productive and collaborative experience, they have also increased to unmanageable sizes. To become a learning environment, these groups need to be much smaller and manageable, which reflects DiMauro's belief. This is where the idea and trend of private online communities could potentially be the future of online communities.

The traditional role of actors, such as social media organizations and governments, have also changed with online social movements. In these online communities, social movement organizations have been less necessary for online participation. While these organizations have continued to play a role in offline engagements, social media organizations have begun to find new avenues for their contribution to social change. Similarly, governments have found new ways to respond to online social movements. They have done this by developing new methods to adapt to social media threats, as well as by developing new methods of repression. As governments have evolved, dissidents have continued to adapt with the new technological affordances. In an online space, uncertain times continue to remain for social activists and governments.

== See also ==
- Slacktivism
- Internet activism
- Accelerated pluralism
- Tactical Adaptation
