= Digital technologies and environmental sustainability =

The interconnection between digital technologies and environmental sustainability (often termed the twin transition) was recognized by the OECD in 2010 and a 2024 review confirmed its continuing relevance.

In Europe, the idea of the twin transition is that green and digital transitions should go together; initiatives such as the European Green Deal and Next Generation EU promote sustainability harnessing digital technologies. Although originating in Europe, the concept "represents a common interest for countries worldwide to navigate the intricate interplay between digital and sustainable transitions."

Digital technologies are acting as integrating and enabling technologies for the economy and profoundly affect society; changes in technology use have damaged the environment but also have the potential to support environmental sustainability.

== See also ==
- Circular economy
- Natural resource management
- Information Age
- Infocommunications

== Bibliography ==
- Certomà, Chiara; Iapaol, Fabio; Martellozzo, Federico, eds. (2025). Digital Technologies for Sustainable Futures: Promises and Pitfalls. Routledge. doi:10.4324/9781003441311. ISBN 978-1-003-44131-1.
- Müller, Matthias; Lang, Stephanie; Stöber, Lea F. (October 2024). "Twin Transition – Hidden Links between the Green and Digital Transition". Journal of Economics Innovation & Management. 45 (45): 57–94.
