= Moinee Foundation =

Indian education non-profit

- Formation: 3 July 2012
- Founded: 2012
- Type: Not For Profit Organisation
- Purpose: Education
- Headquarters: Jaipur
- Founder: Arvind Thanvi
- Key people: Vijay Vyas
- Website: www.moinee.org

Moinee Foundation (मोईनी फ़ाउंडेशन) is a non-government organisation established in 2012, primarily working in the education domain, through techno-social innovations, by closely working with Government Bodies, Educational Institutes (Schools/ Colleges/Universities) and local communities.

Through its various initiatives, the foundation has a presence in 12 states and 33 Districts.

== Story ==
Moinee Foundation was founded back in the year 2012 by Mr. Arvind Thanvi who with no background in social work, left his 14 years of IT career behind him to work towards his goal of bringing the 'Right to Quality Education' in India, especially in government schools.

With his team of five, Thanvi started his journey to understanding the existing problems of the education system to brainstorm its solutions. This led them to these two main issues: lack of ICT lab use in government schools & language adaptation.

=== Quiz Academy ===
In 2004, under the RMSA (Rashtriya Madhyamik Shiksha Abhiyan) program ICT Labs (Information & Computer Technology) were introduced in the government schools of India to build an environment for students to build their capacity for ICT skills & make them learn through computer-aided learning program, but hardly a majority of them were in proper working conditions.

Seeing such a rise in the inoperable computer labs in government schools, the team of Moinee Foundation initiated a program named "Project Utkarsh" in Rajasthan in 2013, collaborating with District Collectors, Education Department, and Local CSR partners to activate ICT computer labs in govt schools and empowering them with curriculum mapped curiosity-based learning system in one's local languages for better understanding of the content by using their online quiz-based learning platform named 'Quiz Academy'.

Quiz Academy not only revived the computer labs of the schools but also made kids aware of the computer systems, their usage on a daily basis, and the basics of using the internet as well. It has all NCERT subject lessons from classes 6th to 10th in the form of quizzes which one can access online from their digital devices.

=== School-In-A-Box ===
As of July 2022, there are 833 million active internet users in India which comprise 59.28% of the population. There are still plenty of rural & tribal areas in the country where the internet hardly exists. Other than the part of accessibility, the internet isn't a safe environment for a young mind to be in, likely a distraction. Spaces where the internet is well available for people to use often end up distracting them with other vast content available on the net itself. According to a study in 2021 by the National Commission for Protecting Child Rights says that out of 3400 school-going children, 42.9% of students have confessed to having a social media account. This is because many people regardless of age still do not have clear guidance on how to use the Internet for their learning & skill-building.

Seeing the rise in this problem Moinee Foundation came up with the idea of 'School-In-A-Box', an offline learning server with the best of internet learning materials that provides its own WiFi hotspot network which one can easily connect to any WiFi supporting devices and access the contents of the server. It promotes self-learning and skill development opportunities for schools and communities. SIAB has been set up pan India in the form of e-libraries and community learning centres apart from being used as a smart class system in schools.

School-in-a-box is easy to use, made in the local language of the area, and creates a whole ecosystem of a smart class. It doesn't require internet, electricity, or any high maintenance and can be used by both teachers and students to set up a digital classroom in a few minutes.

Currently, around 344 servers have been installed in schools, 11 Community Learning Areas, 2 in mobile movable versions of CLCs known as Learning on Wheels, & two in tribal area hostels. The first version of the box was installed as an e-library for communities in areas like Dantewada, Jhalawar, Madhya Pradesh, Sawai Madhopur, and many more. Another was installed in the central jail of Dantewada under a self-learning and skill development program for the inmates.

Currently available in 8 languages: Marathi, Hindi, English, Gujarati, Kannada, Bangla, Tamil & Odia for a better understanding of the content for the learners.
