= Mark Warschauer =

American professor of education

Mark Warschauer (born abt 1954) is an academic and author. Warschauer is a professor of education and informatics at the University of California, Irvine, where is also the director of the Ph.D. in Education program and founding director of the Digital Learning Lab. He is the author or editor of eight books and more than 100 scholarly papers on topics related to technology use for language and literacy development, education, and social inclusion. Warschauer's books have been translated into Chinese, Japanese, and Portuguese and have been critically acclaimed in fields as diverse as education, media studies, cultural studies, communication, sociology, and information studies. Warschauer has been a keynote speaker at conferences in education and applied linguistics throughout the world.

== Background ==
Warschauer served as a faculty researcher and doctoral candidate at the University of Hawaiʻi, where he published several of his early books and also organized two seminal international symposia on technology and language learning. While at the University of Hawaiʻi, Warschauer also founded and edited the academic journal Language Learning & Technology, one of the first peer-reviewed academic journals published on the World Wide Web.

Following Hawaii, Warschauer took a position as director of educational technology on a large language education US Aid project in Egypt.

Since 2001, Warschauer has been a professor in the Department of Education and the Department of Informatics at the University of California, Irvine, where he also contributes to the Center for Research on Information Technology and Organizations and the Ada Byron Research Center for Diversity in Computing and Information Technology. Warschauer is the founding director of the PhD in Education program at UC Irvine, one of the few graduate programs in the U.S. that includes a specialization in language, literacy, and technology.

== Major works ==
=== Computer assisted language learning ===
A number of Warschauer publications recognize the potential of technologies for fostering increased learning opportunities for second language learners. Warschauer's books on the topic, including Internet for English Teaching, Virtual Connections, Telecollaboration in Foreign Language Learning, and Network-Based Language Teaching, attracted the attention of second and foreign language teachers and researchers around the world.

In these books, Warschauer critiqued previous views of computer-assisted language learning, which often emphasized its use in teaching grammar and vocabulary, and instead he articulated a vision of global citizenship and agency through online communication and research.

=== Digital literacy ===
Warschauer's book Electronic Literacy: Language, Culture, and Power in Online Education focuses on the particular skills and competency involved in becoming literate in the digital age, and the impact of this digital literacy on overcoming the marginalization of culturally and linguistically diverse learners.

Warschauer's book Technology and Social Inclusion: Rethinking the Digital Divide argued that social relations, human capital, culture and language are all critical for shaping people's access to and use of new information and communication technologies. The book was based on Warschauer's research on technology, education, and social development projects in Egypt, Brazil, China, India, and the United States.

Warschauer's book, Laptops and Literacy: Learning in the Wireless Classroom focuses on the use of laptops in education. He analyzes how students learn to read, write, think, conduct research, and produce media in the laptop classroom. The book maintains that while laptops help good schools become better they exacerbate issues at troubled schools.

== Recognition ==
Warschauer was the recipient in 1998 of the Educational Testing Service/TOEFL Policy Council Award for outstanding international contribution in the field of technology and language learning. His books have been translated into Chinese, Japanese, and Portuguese and have been critically acclaimed in fields as diverse as education, media studies, cultural studies, communication, sociology, and information studies. He has been a keynote speaker at conferences in education and applied linguistics throughout the world.

== Personal life ==
Warschauer married in 1998.

=== Loss of his son ===
On August 8, 2003, the body of Mark Warschauer's first son Michael was discovered in the backseat of his car in the UC Irvine parking lot. Only 10 months old, "Mikey" had died of heat stroke after Warschauer left him in the car. Warschauer told police he had intended to take Mikey to a day care center before going to his office, but had forgotten the boy was with him. Two months later prosecutors announced that they would not pursue criminal charges against Mark Warschauer, ruling the boy's death accidental. Following the tragic event, Warschauer became active in groups educating parents about children's safety in and around cars. He and his wife went on to have three subsequent children.

== Sample publications ==
=== Authored and co-authored books ===
- Zheng, Binbin, Warschauer, Mark. "One Laptop Per Child" The Bangor Daily News (25 June 2016) p. D4
- Warschauer, M. (2006). Laptops and literacy. New York: Teachers College Press.
- Warschauer, M. (2003). Technology and social inclusion: Rethinking the digital divide. Cambridge, Massachusetts: Massachusetts Institute of Technology Press.
- Warschauer, M. (1999). Electronic literacies: Language, culture, and power in online education. Mahwah, New Jersey: Lawrence Erlbaum Associates.
- Warschauer, M. (1995). E-mail for English teaching: Bringing the Internet and computer learning networks into the language classroom. Alexandria, Virginia: TESOL Publications.
- Warschauer, M, Shetzer, H. & Meloni, C. (2000). Internet for English Teaching. Alexandria, Virginia: TESOL Publications.

=== Edited and co-edited books ===
- Thomas, M., Reinders, H., & Warschauer, M.(Eds.). (2012). Contemporary computer-assisted language learning. London & New York: Bloomsbury Contemporary Linguistics Series.
- Warschauer, M., & Kern, R. (Eds.). (2000). Network-based language teaching: Concepts and practice. Cambridge: Cambridge University Press Applied Linguistics Series.
- Warschauer, M. (Ed.) (1996) Telecollaboration in foreign language learning. Honolulu, Hawaii: University of Hawai'i Second Language Teaching and Curriculum Center.
- Warschauer, M. (Ed.) (1995).Virtual connections: Online activities and projects for networking language learners. Honolulu, Hawaii: University of Hawaiʻi Second Language Teaching and Curriculum Center.
