= Kevin Almeroth =

Professor of computer science

Kevin C. Almeroth
- Education: Georgia Tech (BS, MS, PhD)
- Occupation: professor of computer science at UCSB
- Known for: Senior Member of the Association for Computing Machinery
- Awards: Fellow of IEEE

Kevin C. Almeroth is a professor of computer science at University of California, Santa Barbara. He is a graduate of Georgia Tech where he obtained his B.S. in information and computer science in 1992 as well as M.S. and Ph.D. in computer science in 1994 and 1997 respectively. He was named Fellow of the Institute of Electrical and Electronics Engineers (IEEE) in 2014 for contributions to multicast communication, wireless networks, and educational technology. He is a Senior Member of the Association for Computing Machinery.
