= Sylvia Scribner =

American psychologist

- Born: Sylvia Cohen; 1923
- Died: July 20, 1991 (aged 67–68)
- Education: Smith College, City University of New York (MPsych), New School for Social Research (PhD)
- Occupations: psychologist, educational researcher
- Known for: role of culture in literacy and learning
- Notable work: The Psychology of Literacy
- Spouse: David Scribner (m. 1953)
- Children: 2, plus 3 from his prior marriage
- Parents: Harry Cohen (father); Gussie Cohen (mother)

Sylvia Scribner (1923 – July 20, 1991) was an American psychologist and educational researcher who focused on the role of culture in literacy and learning. Her parents were Gussie and Harry Cohen, and Sylvia Scribner also had a sister, Shirley.

== Biographical outline ==
Born to a Jewish family, Scribner began writing poetry at a young age, and on the strength of her poetry received a full scholarship to Smith College. In 1943, she graduated from Smith College as Valedictorian and Phi Beta Kappa. After graduation, she worked as the research director for United Electrical, Radio and Machine Workers of America, where she worked towards inclusion and lobbied for women and minorities. Scribner later returned to school, receiving a masters in psychology from the City University of New York (CUNY) and a PhD from the New School for Social Research in 1970. She held a series of positions prior to becoming a faculty member of the CUNY Graduate School in 1981, including: senior research associate at Rockefeller University (1970–1978); associate director of the National Institute of Education (1978–1979); and senior scientist at the Center for Applied Linguistics (1979–1981). Scribner held her position as a faculty member at CUNY until her death in 1991.

== Publications ==
Scribner has published a great deal, including various articles and several books. Her seminal work is perhaps The Psychology of Literacy with co-author Michael Cole, on linguistics and learning in the Vai of Liberia. She also contributed to a 1978 edition of Vygotsky's Mind in society: The development of higher psychological processes, edited with Michael Cole, Vera John-Steiner, and Ellen Souberman.

After Scribner died, the book Mind and social practice: Selected writings of Sylvia Scribner (a collection of her unpublished essays) was published in 1997. The editors all were close with Scribner: Ethel Tobach, Rachel Joffe Falmagne, Mary Brown Parlee, & Laura M.W. Martin were all friends and colleagues; Aggie Scribner Kapelman is her daughter. They prefaced the book with both personal and professional biographical details.

== Awards ==
As a freshman at Smith College in 1940, Scribner was a William Allen Neilson Scholar, and as a sophomore she received the Arthur Ellis Hamm Scholarship Prize for her excellent academic scholarship. Later, in 1982, Scribner and Michael Cole received the Melville J. Herskovits Prize in 1982 for The Psychology of Literacy.

In recognition of Scribner's scholarship and contributions to the field, the American Educational Research Association annually awards the Scribner Award to outstanding scholars in the field of learning and instruction. Recipients include Marilyn Jager Adams, Richard C. Anderson, Gavriel Salomon, and Keith Stanovich.

== Personal life ==
Sylvia Scribner married David Scribner in 1953. They had two children together, Oliver and Aggie, and three children from David's previous marriage, Toni, Wendy, and Nancy.
