= Bruce Bimber =

American political scientist

Bruce Bimber FAAAS, FICA
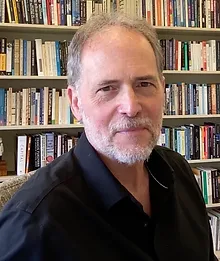
- Bimber in 2024.
- Occupations: Professor, political scientist, communication scholar

Academic background
- Education: Ph.D. in Political Science (1992); BS Electrical Engineering (1983)
- Alma mater: Massachusetts Institute of Technology, Stanford University

Academic work
- Discipline: Political science
- Sub-discipline: Political Communication, digital media, collective action
- Institutions: University of California, Santa Barbara
- Main interests: Political communication, social media, political behavior, collective action, technological determinism
- Notable works: Information and American Democracy (2003)
- Influenced: David Karpf, Steven Livingston
- Website: www.brucebimber.net

Bruce A. Bimber FAAAS, FICA is an American social scientist, author, and academic. Bimber is a Distinguished Professor of Political Science at the University of California, Santa Barbara (UCSB). He is known for his work in political communication, particularly the relationship between digital media and human behavior in political organization and collective action. Bimber was the founding director of the Center for Information Technology and Society at UCSB, and the founder of the Center for Nanotechnology and Society, has been a Fellow of the American Association for the Advancement of Science since 2011, and is a Fellow of the International Communication Association.

== Biography ==
=== Early life and education ===
As an undergraduate, Bimber studied electrical engineering and graduated from Stanford University. He then worked in Silicon Valley during the 1980s before pursuing graduate studies in political science, earning his Ph.D. from the Massachusetts Institute of Technology in 1992. Before joining the faculty at UC Santa Barbara, he worked at the RAND Corporation in Washington, D.C., on education policy and technology policy.

=== Academia and research work ===
At UC Santa Barbara, Bimber has been affiliated with the Department of Political Science, and the Center for Information Technology and Society (which he founded in 1999), and has a courtesy appointment with the Department of Communication. He is also involved with the Center for Responsible Machine Learning. Bimber’s research examines how digital media affect democratic politics, with a particular focus on the problems associated with social media, such as selective exposure, polarization, populism, and disinformation.

Bimber's book "Information and American Democracy" (2003, Cambridge University Press) explored how radical changes in technological mediums create opportunities for innovation, highlighting the concept of post-bureaucratic organizations. In this book and earlier work, Bimber argued that the Internet's primary political effect was not increasing overall participation but rather accelerating collective action among already-engaged citizens by facilitating the formation of advocacy and protest groups. Political scientist David Karpf has cited Bimber's work as foundational to understanding how organizations like MoveOn.org and Daily Kos differ from older activist groups in their use of digital tools.

Bimber has long argued that the impact of the Internet on political behavior is complex. In 2000, he said the Internet should not be viewed as a single entity with a uniform effect, that is either good or bad, and more research was needed to understand its impact fully. In 2023, he characterized the internet as a "virtual Wild West" lacking the regulatory frameworks common to other major industries. Bimber has called for stronger public policy responses to harms associated with the internet and has expressed concern about the pace of AI development outrunning regulatory frameworks.

Bimber has also written on technological determinism, arguing that Karl Marx was more economically deterministic than technologically deterministic, and proposing a typology of approaches to technological determinism.

Bimber's recent research has examined conspiracy theories and misinformation in the US and Europe. His research has examined how different social media platforms vary in their implications for the spread of conspiracy theories and misinformation.

=== Fellowships ===
Bimber was named a Fellow of the American Association for the Advancement of Science in 2011. He is also a fellow of the International Communication Association and a past fellow of the Center for Advanced Study in the Behavioral Sciences.

== Selected publications ==
=== Books ===
- Bimber, B. (2003). Information and American democracy: Technology in the evolution of political power. Cambridge University Press.
- Bimber, B. A. (1996). The politics of expertise in Congress: The rise and fall of the Office of Technology Assessment. SUNY Press. ISBN 9780791430590
- Bimber, B., Flanagin, A., & Stohl, C. (2012). Collective action in organizations: Interaction and engagement in an era of technological change. Cambridge University Press. ISBN 9780521191722
- Bimber, B., & Davis, R. (2003). Campaigning online: The Internet in US elections. Oxford University Press. ISBN 9780198034575

=== Selected recent journal articles ===
- Bimber, B., Labarre, J., Gomez, D., Nikiforov, I., & Koc-Michalska, K. (2024). Media use, feelings of being devalued, and democratically corrosive sentiment in the US. International Journal of Press/Politics. doi:10.1177/19401612241253455
- Gelovani, S., Theocharis, Y., Koc-Michalska, K., & Bimber, B. (2024). Intergroup ethnocentrism and social media: Evidence from three western democracies. Information, Communication & Society. doi:10.1080/1369118X.2024.2375259
- Gomez, D., Gueirrez Garcia-Pardo, I., Labarre, J., & Bimber, B. (2024). Beyond Large Language Models: Rediscovering the role of classical statistics in modern data science. Proceedings of the IEEE World Congress on Computational Intelligence.
- Theocharis, Y., Boulianne, S., Koc-Michalska, K., & Bimber, B. (2023). Platform affordances and political participation: How social media reshape political engagement. West European Politics, 46(4), 788-811. doi:10.1080/01402382.2022.2087410
- Mei, A., Kabir, A., Levy, S., Subbiah, M., Allaway, E., Judge, J., Patton, D., Bimber, B., McKeown, K., & Yang, W. (2022). Mitigating covertly unsafe text within natural language systems. Findings of the 2022 Conference on Empirical Methods in Natural Language Processing. arXiv:2210.09306
- Bimber, B. & Gil de Zúñiga, H. (2022). Social influence and political participation around the world. European Journal of Political Science, 14(2), 135-154. doi:10.1017/S175577392200008X
