= Michael Cole (psychologist) =

American psychologist

- Born: April 13, 1938 (age 88); Los Angeles, California, U.S.
- Education: University of California, Los Angeles; Indiana University Bloomington
- Known for: Cross-cultural psychology
- Awards: Herskovits Prize (1982); APA Award for Distinguished Contributions to the International Advancement of Psychology (2006)
- Scientific career
- Fields: Cultural psychology
- Workplaces: Rockefeller University; University of California, San Diego
- Thesis: Search behavior: a correction procedure for three-choice probability learning (1962)

Michael Cole (born April 13, 1938) is an American psychologist and professor emeritus at the University of California, San Diego (UCSD), where he held positions in the Department of Psychology, the Department of Communication, and the Human Development Program. His research focuses on the development of a mediational theory of mind, as well as the promotion of partnerships between UCSD and the community.

== Career ==
After teaching as an associate professor at the University of California for three years, Cole joined the faculty of Rockefeller University in 1969, also as an associate professor. He was promoted to a full professor at Rockefeller in 1975. In 1978, he joined the UCSD faculty with a joint appointment in psychology and communication. In 1995, he became the director of UCSD's Laboratory of Comparative Human Cognition, and in 1999, he was named one of UCSD's university professors.

== Professional affiliations ==
Cole is a member of the National Academy of Education and the American Academy of Arts and Sciences.
