= Mark Burry =

New Zealand architect (born 1957)

Mark Burry AO
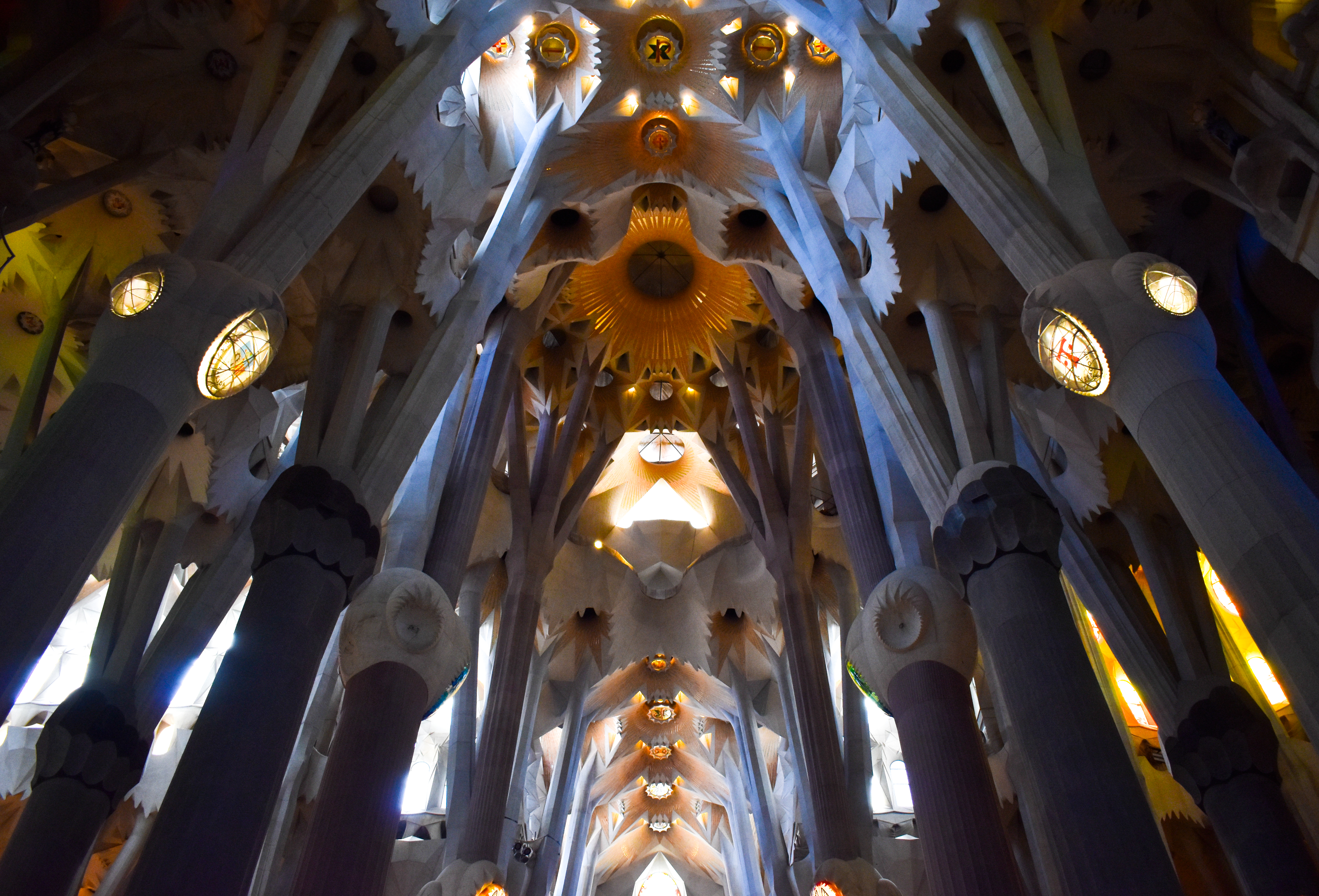
- Born: 24 February 1957 (age 69); Christchurch, New Zealand
- Education: University of Cambridge
- Occupations: Architect, Academic, Professor
- Parent: Hugh Burry
- Projects: Sagrada Família

Mark Cameron Burry AO (born 24 February 1957) is a New Zealand architect. He is the Foundation Director of Swinburne University of Technology’s Smart Cities Research Institute.

Previous to that, he was the Professor of Innovation and Director of the Spatial Information Architecture Laboratory and founding Director of the Design Research Institute at RMIT University, Melbourne, Australia. He is also executive architect and researcher at the Sagrada Familia basilica in Barcelona, Catalonia, Spain.

== Early life and family ==
Born in Christchurch, New Zealand in 1957, Burry is the son of All Black Hugh Burry. He studied architecture at the University of Cambridge, receiving a BA in architecture in 1979, a Diploma in Architecture in 1982 and an MA in architecture in 1989.

== Research, collaboration and teaching ==
Previously, Burry has been a visiting professor at University of Liverpool, the Massachusetts Institute of Technology, the Universitat Politècnica de Catalunya and Victoria University of Wellington. He has collaborated with Gehry Partners LLP, dECOi Paris, Foster and Partners and Arup and was a member of the Prime Minister's Science, Engineering and Innovation Council in 2005 as part of the working group examining the role of creativity in the innovation economy.

== Awards ==
- William J Mitchell International Chapter Prize, Australian Institute of Architects, 2024
- Officer of the Order of Australia, 2018
- Federation Fellowship, Australian Research Council, 2006
- Award for Innovative Research, ACADIA, 2006
- Achiever Award (Creative Melbourne), Committee for Melbourne, 2004
- Diploma I la insignia a l’acadèmic correspondent, Reial Acadèmia Catalana de Belles Arts de Sant Jordi, 2003

== Bibliography ==
Burry has published widely on the Sagrada Família, digital architecture and design computing. He is a member of the Architectural Design editorial board.

=== Books ===
- The Innovation Imperative: Architecture of Vitality (with Pia Ednie-Brown and Andrew Burrow), Chichester: John Wiley & Sons, ISBN 9781119978657
- Scripting Cultures: Architectural Design and Programming, Chichester: John Wiley & Sons, 2011, ISBN 9780470746417
- Sagrada Familia sXXI: Gaud ara-ahora-now (with Jordi Coll Grifoll and Josep Gomez Serrano), Ediciones UPC: Barcelona, 2010, ISBN 9788498803990
- The New Mathematics of Architecture (with Jane Burry), London: Thames & Hudson, 2010, ISBN 9780500342640
- Gaudi Unseen: Completing the Sagrada Familia (ed.), JOVIS Verlag: Berlin, 3008, ISBN 9783939633785
- La Sagrada Família: de Gaudí al CAD (with Jordi Coll, Josep Gomez, Juan Melero), Ediciones UPC: Barcelona, 1996, 9788483011485
- The Expiatory Church of the Sagrada Família, London: Phaidon Press, 1993, ISBN 9780714828497
