= Rivka Oxman =

Israeli architect

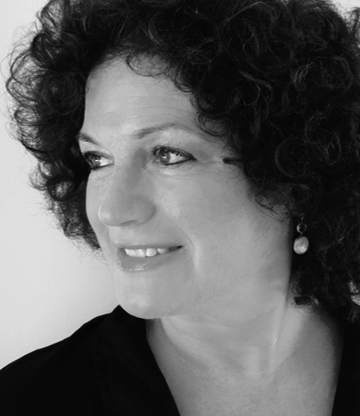
Oxman in 2009

Rivka Oxman (Hebrew: רבקה אוקסמן; April 6, 1948 - March 16, 2025) was an Israeli architect, researcher, and professor at the Technion Institute in Haifa. Her research interests are related to design and computation, including digital architecture and methods, and exploring their contribution to the emergence of new paradigms of architectural design and practice.

== Life and career ==
Oxman was born in 1948 to Joseph Eidelman, an Israeli structural engineer and professor at the Technion, and Miriam Eidelman, a schoolteacher. She graduated from the Hebrew Reali School in Haifa in 1966. She received graduate and undergraduate degrees from the Technion – Israel Institute of Technology, where she later became a professor and Vice Dean for Teaching at the Faculty of Architecture and Town Planning. She has been a visiting professor at Stanford University and Delft University of Technology and held research appointments at MIT and Berkeley. She has worked at the University of Sydney and Kaiserslautern University.

She married fellow architect Robert Oxman, and they have two daughters, Neri and Keren.

In 2006 she was elected as a Fellow of the Design Research Society (DRS) for her work in design research. She is an Associate Editor of Design Studies, and on the editorial board of other journals on design theory and on digital design.

In 2010 she and her husband co-edited a special issue of the journal Architectural Design on “New Structuralism" – the convergence of new design, engineering and architectural technology to a new mode of synthesizing materials and creating space. In 2014 they edited the book Theories of the Digital in Architecture (2014), an overview of the field with chapters from dozens of contributors. Rivka Oxman also edited special issues of Design Studies on Digital Design (2006) and Parametric Design Thinking (2017).

In November 2017 Oxman was awarded an Honorary Doctorate (Honoris Causas) for her research on theories of digital design and exploring the contribution of digital technologies to novel paradigms in design and architecture by the Universitat Internacional de Catalunya (UIC Barcelona).

== Publications ==
=== Academic papers ===
Oxman has published papers in scientific journals, conference books, and as invited chapters in books.

- Oxman Rivka (1990). "Design Shells: A Formalism for Prototype Refinement in Knowledge-Based Design Systems". Artificial Intelligence in Engineering Vol. 5, No. 9
- Oxman Rivka (1990). "Prior Knowledge in Design, A Dynamic Knowledge-Based Model of Design and Creativity" Design Studies, Butterworth-Heinemann. Vol.11, No.1
- Oxman Rivka (1994). "Precedents in Design: a Computational Model for the Organization of Precedent Knowledge", Design Studies, Vol. 15 No. 2
- Oxman Rivka (1997). "Design by Re-Representation: A Model of Visual Reasoning in Design" in Akin O. (ed.) a special issue on Prescriptive and Descriptive Models of Design, Design Studies, Vol. 18, No. 4
- Oxman Rivka (1999) "Educating the Designerly Thinker” in W.M. McCracken, C.M. Eastman and W. Newsletter (eds.) special issue on Cognition in Design Education, Design Studies Vol. 20, No.2
- Oxman Rivka (2001). “The Mind in Design - A Conceptual Framework for Cognition in Design Education” in C. Eastman, W.M. McCracken and W. Newsletter (Eds.) Knowing and Learning to Design: Cognition in Design Education, Elsevier, Oxford
- Bar-On D.* and Oxman R. (2002) “Context Over content: ICPD, A Conceptual Schema for the Building Technology Domain” Automation in Construction, Vol 11, No.4
- Oxman Rivka (2002). “The Thinking Eye: Visual Re-Cognition in Design Emergence”. Design Studies, Vol. 23 No. 2
  This paper received the Annual Design Studies Best Paper Award, granted by the Design Research Society and Elsevier Science.
- Oxman Rivka (2003) “Think-Maps: Teaching Design Thinking in Design Education”. Design Studies, Vol. 25 No. 1
- Oxman Rivka, Palmon O.* Shahar M. and Weiss P. T. (2004). "Beyond the Reality Syndrome: Designing Presence in Virtual Environments" in Architecture in the Network Society, ECAADE 2004, European Computer Aided Architectural Design in Education, ISBN 978-0-9541183-2-7 Copenhagen, Denmark
- Oxman Rivka (2006) “Theory and Design in the First Digital Age” Design Studies, Vol. 27 No. 3
- Sass L. and Oxman Rivka (2006) “Materializing Design” Design Studies, Vol. 27 No. 3
- Oxman Rivka (2007) "Digital Architecture: Re-thinking Theory, Knowledge, Models and Medium – Challenge to Digital Design and Design Pedagogy"
- Oxman Rivka (2008) “Performance based Design: Current Practices and Research Issues” IJAC International Journal of Architectural Computing Vol. 6 Issue 1
- Oxman Rivka (2010) “Morphogenesis in the theory and methodology of digital tectonics“ in a special issue on Morphogenesis, IASS: Journal of the International Association for Shell and Spatial Structures, 51(3)
- Oxman Rivka and Oxman Robert (2010) Guest Editors, “The New Structuralism: Design, Engineering and Architectural Technologies”, a special issue of Architectural Design. Wiley Publications, July 2010, ISBN 978-0-470-74227-3

=== Books ===
- Theories of the Digital in Architecture (2014) – Rivka Oxman and Robert Oxman, Editors, ISBN 978-0-415-46924-1

=== Lectures and presentations ===
Oxman's public lectures and keynotes tend to be on digital design, education, computation, and design cognition.

- "Informed Tectonics in Material-based Design" (2013) in SIM, the International Conference on Sustainable Intelligent Manufacturing, Lisbon, Portugal
- "The New Structuralism" (2011) in CAAD, the International Conference on Computer Aided Design in Architecture, Liege, Belgium
- "The New Structuralism as a Material Practice" (2011) in CAADRIA 2001, Newcastle, Australia
- "Digital architecture as a challenge for design pedagogy: theory, knowledge, models and medium in Concepts beyond Geometry" (2009) in DMS, The International Design Modeling Symposium, Berlin, Germany
- "DDNET Conceptual Structures of Digital Design" (2009) in SIGraDi 2009, São Paulo, Brazil
- "Morphogenesis in Archi-Engineering" (2008) in IASS 2008, The 6th International Symposium on Structural Morphology, Workshop on Digital Morphogenesis Acapulco, Mexico
- "Digital Design Theory and Methodology" (2007) in the Rhino Symposium in association with London Metropolitan University, London, UK
- "Digital Design Paradigms" (2005) under the MECESUP UCH-0217 initiative, Celebration of the 155 year anniversary of the Faculty of Architecture and Urbanism, Santiago, Chile
- "Theoretical Foundations of Digital Architecture" (2004) in the 8th Iberoamerican Congress of Digital Design, Porto Alegre, Brazil
- "The Challenge of Design Computation" (1997) in ECAADE 5th International Conference of the European Computer Aided Architectural Design in Education, Vienna University of Technology, Vienna, Austria
