= Richard Castillo =

Richard Castillo may refer to:

- Richard Castillo (Star Trek), a character on Star Trek
- Richard Castillo (baseball) (born 1989), baseball pitcher
- Richard Moreta Castillo (born 1965), architect
