= Computer-aided architectural design =

Way to visualize and design structures

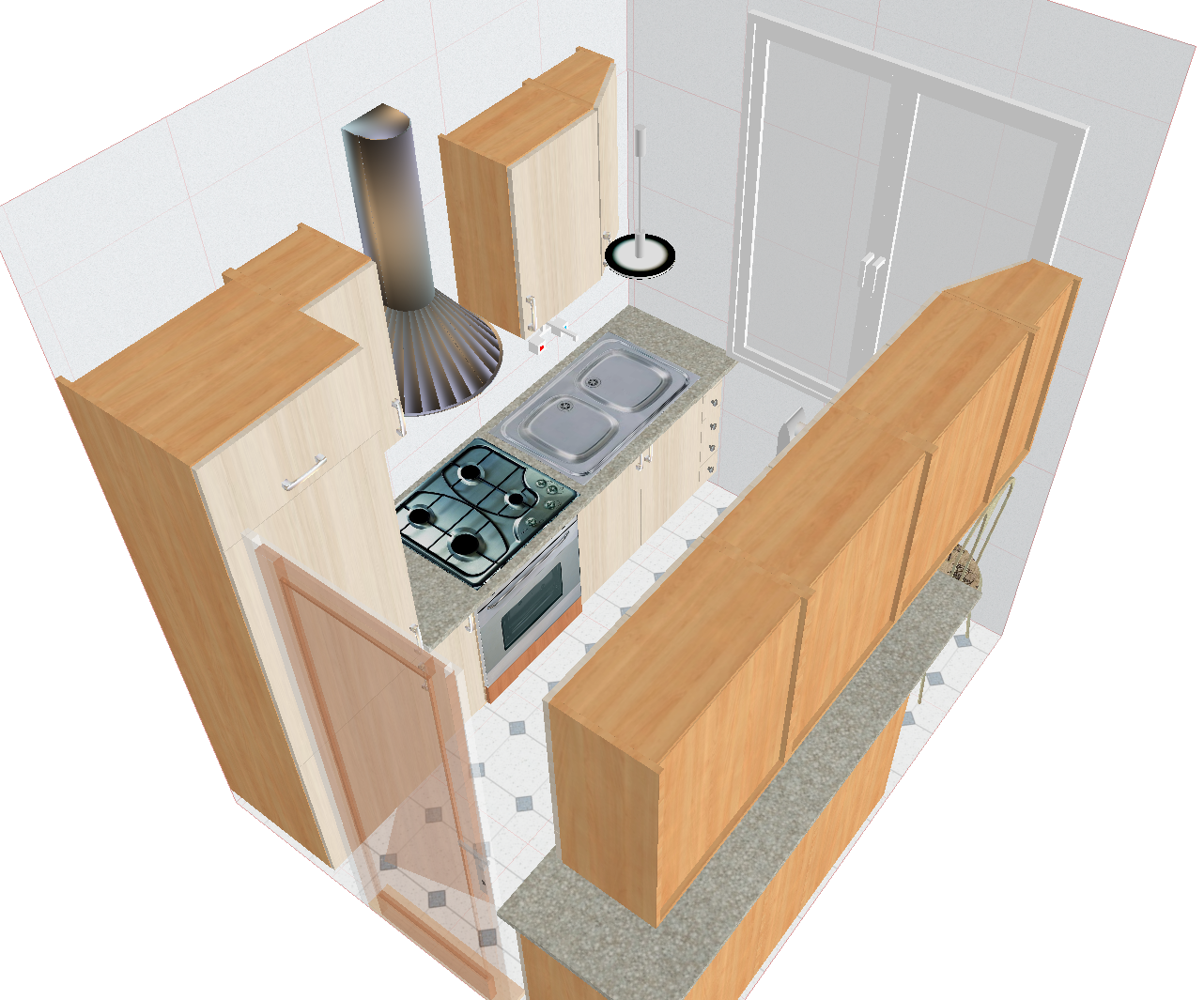
Example of Computer-aided architectural design

Computer-aided architectural design (CAAD) software programs are the repository of accurate and comprehensive records of buildings and are used by architects and architectural companies for architectural design and architectural engineering. As the latter often involve floor plan designs CAAD software greatly simplifies this task.

== History ==
The first attempts to computerize the architectural design date back to the 1960s:

- CRAFT (1963) was one of the first systems to automate an architectural design task (optimizing the layout of a manufacturing plant);
- Sketchpad (1963) was the precursor of the computer-aided design programs, it computerized the drawing and allowed setting of parametric relationships between objects via a graphical user interface;
- DAC-1 (1963-1964) was a CAD-like program developed by General Motors.

The first attempts to separate the CAAD from generic CAD were made in the 1970s. The practical commercial tools for architecture design and building information modeling appeared a decade later, in the 1980s. Due to availability of the tools, computerized design in architecture became a distinct field within the architecture. The intervening years were characterized by the rapid growth in the research: the Design Methods conference (1962) had put the design research on the map, the 1st International Congress on Performance (1972) discussed the early approaches to computerizing the building performance simulations.

New research journals had focused on the subject in the 1990s and 2000s: Automation in Construction (1992), International Journal of Architectural Computing (2003), Journal of Building Performance Simulation (2008). Architectural Design and Design Studies, established in 1979, gradually moved to CAAD.

Computer-aided design also known as CAD was originally the type of program that architects used, but since CAD could not offer all the tools that architects needed to complete a project, CAAD developed as a distinct class of software.

== Terminology ==
Use of terms in the field of computer design is not consistent. Caetano et al. analyzed the language of architectural research publications and noted the following trends:

- Some authors use the term "computational design" (CD) as any activity involving the CAD tools, thus making it a synonym of digital design. Other researchers exclude the automation of drafting from the definition of CD.
- The terms parametric design (PD), generative design (GD), algorithmic design (AD) are very popular for the non-drafting uses of the CAAD tools (3 out of top 4 CAAD design definition terms), frequently used together and confused with one another.
- performance-based design is the 3rd most popular term, independent of PD, GD, and AD.

== Overview ==
All CAD and CAAD systems employ a database with geometric and other properties of objects; they all have some kind of graphic user interface to manipulate a visual representation rather than the database; and they are all more or less concerned with assembling designs from standard and non-standard pieces. Currently, the main distinction which causes one to speak of CAAD rather than CAD lies in the domain knowledge (architecture-specific objects, techniques, data, and process support) embedded in the system. A CAAD system differs from other CAD systems in two respects:

- It has an explicit object database of building parts and construction knowledge.
- It explicitly supports the creation of architectural objects.

In a more general sense, CAAD also refers to the use of any computational technique in the field of architectural design other than by means of architecture-specific software. For example, software which is specifically developed for the computer animation industry (e.g. Maya and 3DStudio Max), is also used in architectural design. These programs can produce photo realistic 3d renders and animations. Nowadays real-time rendering is being popular thanks to the developments in graphic cards. The exact distinction of what properly belongs to CAAD is not always clear. Specialized software, for example for calculating structures by means of the finite element method, is used in architectural design and in that sense may fall under CAAD. On the other hand, such software is seldom used to create new designs.

In 1974 Caad became a current word and was a common topic of commercial modernization.

== Three-dimensional objects ==
CAAD has two types of structures in its program. The first system is surface structure which provides a graphics medium to represent three-dimensional objects using two-dimensional representations. Also algorithms that allow the generation of patterns and their analysis using programmed criteria, and data banks that store information about the problem at hand and the standards and regulations that applies to it. The second system is deep structure which means that the operations performed by the computer have natural limitations. Computer hardware and machine languages that are supported by these make it easy to perform arithmetical operations quickly and accurately. Also an almost illogical number of layers of symbolic processing can be built enabling the functionalities that are found at the surface.

== Advantages ==
Another advantage to CAAD is the two way mapping of activities and functionalities. The two instances of mapping are indicated to be between the surface structures and the deep structures. These mappings are abstractions that are introduced in order to discuss the process of design and deployment of CAAD systems. In designing the systems the system developers usually consider surface structures. A one-to-one mapping is the typical statement, which is to develop a computer based functionality that maps as closely as possible into a corresponding manual design activity, for example, drafting of stairs, checking spatial conflict between building systems, and generating perspectives from orthogonal views. The architectural design processes tend to integrate models isolated so far. Many different kinds of expert knowledge, tools, visualization techniques, and media are to be combined. The design process covers the complete life cycle of the building. The areas that are covered are construction, operations, reorganization, as well as destruction. Considering the shared use of digital design tools and the exchange of information and knowledge between designers and across different projects, we speak of a design continuum.

An architect's work involves mostly visually represented data. Problems are often outlined and dealt with in a graphical approach. Only this form of expression serves as a basis for work and discussion. Therefore, the designer should have maximum visual control over the processes taking place within the design continuum. Further questions occur about navigation, associative information access, programming and communication within very large data sets.

== See also ==
- Architectural geometry
- Architectural engineering
- Artificial Architecture
- Association for Computer Aided Architectural Design Research in Asia
- Building information modeling
- Comparison of CAD software
- Computer-aided design
  - Geometric modeling kernel
- Design computing
- Digital morphogenesis
- List of BIM software
