= Hugh Burry =

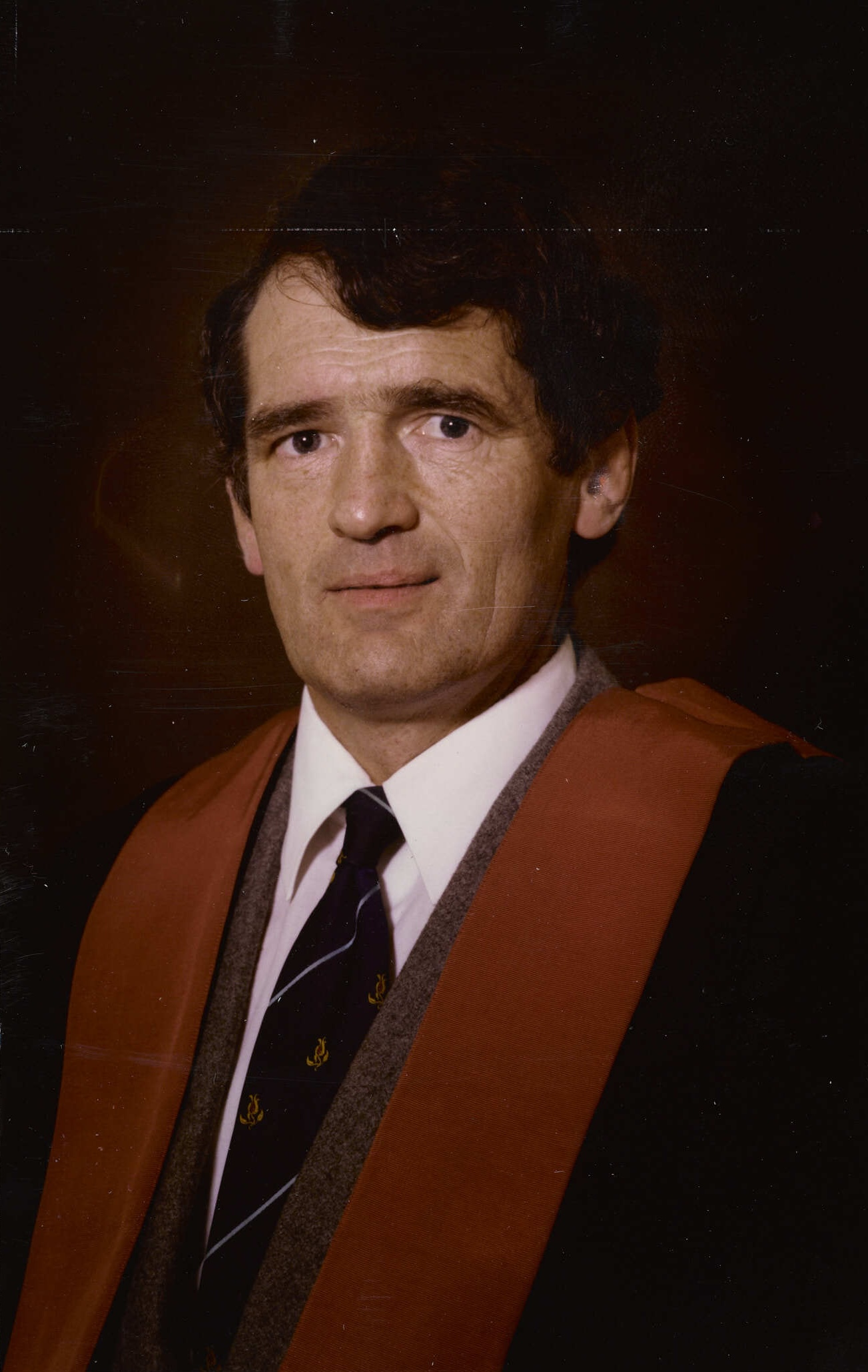
- Burry in 1981
- Born: Hugh Cameron Burry; 29 October 1930 Christchurch, New Zealand
- Died: 18 June 2013 (aged 82) Hanmer Springs, New Zealand
- Height: 1.83 m (6 ft 0 in)
- Weight: 90 kg (200 lb)
- School: Christ’s College
- University: University of Otago
- Notable relative: Mark Burry (son)
- Occupation: Physician

Rugby union career
- Position: Number 8
Provincial / State sides
Years	Team	Apps	(Points)
1955–62	Canterbury	41	
International career
Years	Team	Apps	(Points)
1960	New Zealand	0	(0)

Hugh Cameron Burry (29 October 1930 – 18 June 2013) was a New Zealand rugby union player and physician. He was also an accomplished cricketer, and was eligible for representing New Zealand in international competition, though he did never did so.

Burry played 41 times for Canterbury between 1955 and 1962, in the back row. He played for the All Blacks on the 1960 tour of South Africa; despite a groin injury he played 11 games, scoring 8 tries, but played in no tests.

Because of the demands of medical studies and practice, Burry did not play for the All Blacks until 1960. He was a general practitioner in New Brighton, Christchurch, from 1957 to 1965, then a medical registrar at Christchurch Hospital. Burry then went to London until 1976, working at Guy's Hospital and lecturing at London University. He could not get his views on the dangers of scrums and of potentially life-threatening injuries from poor scrum techniques accepted until he published them in the British Medical Journal. Later he was a member of the IRB's medical advisory committee, and oversaw medical services for the first Rugby World Cup in 1987.

Burry was an associate professor of rheumatology at the Wellington Clinical School until 1987, then was professor of rehabilitation medicine at Melbourne University until he retired in 1991. He retired to Hanmer Springs in North Canterbury, where he conducted research for the ACC, and was a consultant on rheumatology and rehabilitative medicine until 2000. Burry died on 18 June 2013, in Hanmer Springs.

Burry's son Mark is an architect, best known for his role as executive architect and researcher for the Sagrada Família.
