= University of Sydney Design Lab =

Research centre in the University of Sydney

The University of Sydney Design Lab, formerly the Key Centre of Design Computing and Cognition, is a teaching and research centre of the University's School of Architecture, Design and Planning, established in 1968. The aim of the centre is to apply human-centred design to products, services and systems.

The Key Centre of Design Computing and Cognition was founded in 1968 by John Gero (its Foundation Director) to research computers in design as a way of modeling and understanding designing. In 2007, after the departure of its co-directors John Gero and Mary Lou Maher, it changed its name to the Design Lab. During the intervening years its ambit grew to embrace teaching. The KCDC’s research is founded on the use of a scientific approach to the development of models, theories and methods to understand designs and designing.

== Naming history ==
- 1968 Computer Applications Research Unit (Gero 1972)
- 1973 Renamed Architectural Computing Unit
- 1982 Renamed Design Computing Unit
- 1990 Renamed Key Centre of Design Computing
- 1998 Renamed Key Centre of Design Computing and Cognition
- 2007 Renamed Design Lab

== Research ==
The KCDC from 1968-2007 had four overlapping foci in its design research:

- The first phase (1968-1975) researched design via simulation (Gero 1970).
- The second phase (1972-1983) researched design via optimization.
- The third phase (1979-2007) researched design using artificial intelligence and knowledge-based approaches, with a focus on design theory, design synthesis and computational creativity (Gero and Maher 1996a; Gero and Maher 1996b).
- The fourth phase (1992-2007) researched cognitive aspects of designing as a basis for models of design and as foundations for design computing.

== Teaching ==
- Undergraduate architecture student teaching of computational approaches to design, introduced in 1966 (predating the establishment of the Centre)
- Professional courses for practicing designers on computational approaches to design, introduced in 1969
- PhD program in design research, introduced in 1969 (Gero 2004)
- Master of Architectural Computing, introduced in 1978
- Graduate Diploma in Architectural Computing, introduced in 1978 (Gero 1980)
- Master of Design Science (Design Computing), introduced in 1988
- Bachelor of Design Computing, introduced in 2003

== Conferences ==
The Key Centre was very active in organizing conferences and workshops as a means of both creating a research community and producing a broader impact.
