= Design computing =

Computing as applied to design

Design computing (also known as design and computation and computational design) is the study and practice of design activities through the application and development of novel ideas and techniques in computing. One of the early groups to coin this term was the Key Centre of Design Computing and Cognition at the University of Sydney in Australia, which for more than fifty years (since the late 1960s) pioneered the research, teaching, and consulting of design and computational technologies. This group organised the academic conference series "Artificial Intelligence in Design (AID)" published by Springer during that period. AID was later renamed "Design Computing and Cognition (DCC)" and is currently a leading biannual conference in the field. Other notable groups in this area are the Design and Computation group at Massachusetts Institute of Technology's School of Architecture + Planning and the Computational Design group at Georgia Tech.

Whilst these terms share in general an interest in computational technologies and design activity, there are important differences in the various approaches, theories, and applications. For example, while in some circles the term "computational design" refers in general to the creation of new computational tools and methods in the context of computational thinking, design computing is concerned with bridging these two fields in order to build an increased understanding of design.

The Bachelor of Design Computing (BDesComp) was created in 2003 at the University of Sydney and continues to be a leading programme in interaction design and creative technologies, now hosted by the Design Lab. In that context, design computing is defined to be the use and development of computational models of design processes and digital media to assist and/or automate various aspects of the design process with the goal of producing higher quality and new design forms.

== Areas ==
In recent years a number of research and education areas have been grouped under the umbrella term "design computing", namely:

- Building Automation Systems
- Artificial intelligence in design
- Expert systems and knowledge-based systems
- Computational creativity
- Computer-aided design
- Responsive computer-aided design
- Digital architecture
- Digital morphogenesis
- Visual and spatial modelling
- Computational analogy
- Automated design systems
- Design support systems
- Computer-supported cooperative work (CSCW)
- Building information modeling (BIM)
- Extended reality (XR) and spatial computing
- Digital place-making

== Research groups ==
The main research groups working in this area span from Faculties of Architecture, Engineering and Computer Science. Australia has been a pioneer in this area. For the last five decades the Key Centre of Design Computing and Cognition (KCDC), currently known as the Design Lab, at the University of Sydney has been active in establishing this area of research and teaching. The University of Sydney offers a Bachelor of Design Computing () and the University of New South Wales also in Sydney a Bachelor of Computational Design (). In the US this research area is also known as "Design and Computation", namely at the Massachusetts Institute of Technology (MIT). Other relevant research groups include:

- Critical Research in Digital Architecture (CRIDA), Faculty of Architecture, Building and Planning, University of Melbourne
- School of Architecture, Carnegie Mellon
- Department of Computer Science, University College London
- Department of Informatics Engineering, Universidade de Coimbra
- Department of Computer Science, Vrije University, Amsterdam
- Creativity and Cognition Studios, University of Technology Sydney
- Department of Computer Science, University of Colorado at Boulder
- Department of Architecture, Tokyo Institute of Technology
- Department of Architecture, MIT
- Department of Computer Science, Helsinki University of Technology
- College of Architecture, Georgia Institute of Technology
- Design Machine Group, University of Washington College of Built Environments, Seattle
- Design Computing Program, Georgia Institute of Technology College of Architecture
- School of Interactive Arts + Technology, Simon Fraser University
- Department of Architecture, Technical University of Delft, The Netherlands
- Institute of Computational Design, University of Stuttgart
- Architectural Design Computing, Istanbul Technical University
- Faculty of Architecture, Istanbul Bilgi University, Turkey
- Centre of IT and Architecture (CITA), The Royal Danish Academy of Fine Arts, Copenhagen
- Institute of Architectural Algorithms & Applications (Inst.AAA), Southeast University, Nanjing
- Department of Experimental and Digital Design and Construction, University of Kassel, Germany
- Computational Media Design (CMD) program, University of Calgary, Canada
- School of Civil Engineering, Architecture and Urbanism (FEC-Unicamp), University of Campinas, Brazil
- Computation, Appearance, and Manufacturing group (CAM), Max Planck Institute for Informatics, Saarbrücken, Germany

== Conferences ==
The biannual International Conference on Design Computing and Cognition (DCC) brings together high quality research on this area, as do annual conferences by the Association for Computer Aided Design In Architecture and others.
