= Digital morphogenesis =

Type of generative art

Digital morphogenesis is a type of generative art in which complex shape development, or morphogenesis, is enabled by computation. This concept is applicable in many areas of design, art, architecture, and modeling. The concept was originally developed in the field of biology, later in geology, geomorphology, and architecture.

In architecture, it describes tools and methods for creating forms and adapting them to a known environment.

Developments in digital morphogenesis have allowed construction and analysis of structures in more detail than could have been put into a blueprint or model by hand, with structure at all levels defined by iterative algorithms. As fabrication techniques advance, it is becoming possible to produce objects with fractal or other elaborate structures.

== Notable persons ==
- Alan Turing
- Neri Oxman
- Rivka Oxman

== See also ==
- Bionics, Biomimicry
- Digital architecture, Blobitecture
- Generative art, Evolutionary art
- Evolutionary computation
- L-systems

== Reading ==
- Burry, Jane, et al. (2005). 'Dynamical Structural Modeling: A Collaborative Design Exploration', International Journal of Architectural Computing, 3, 1, pp. 27–42
- Colabella, Enrica and Soddu, Celestino (1992). http://www.artscience-ebookshop.com/GenerativeArtDesign.htm GENERATIVE ART & DESIGN Theory, Methodology and Projects. Environmental Design of MORPHOGENESIS, Genetic Codes of Artificial (English Version, Argenia Pub. 2020); Il Progetto Ambientale di Morfogenesi (italian version) (Bologna: Progetto Leonardo)
- De Landa, Manuel (1997). A Thousand Years of Nonlinear History (New York: Zone Books)
- Feuerstein, Günther (2002). Biomorphic Architecture: Human and Animal Forms in Architecture (Stuttgart; London: Axel Menges)
- Frazer, John H. (1995). An Evolutionary Architecture , Themes VII (London: Architectural Association)
- Hensel, Michael and Achim Menges (2008). 'Designing Morpho-Ecologies: Versatility and Vicissitude of Heterogeneous Space', Architectural Design, 78, 2, pp. 102–111
- Hensel, Michael, Achim Menges, and Michael Weinstock, eds (2004). Emergence: Morphogenetic Design Strategies, Architectural Design (London: Wiley)
- Hensel, Michael and Achim Menges (2006). 'Material and Digital Design Synthesis', Architectural Design, 76, 2, pp. 88–95
- Hensel, Michael and Achim Menges (2006). 'Differentiation and Performance: Multi-Performance Architectures and Modulated Environments', Architectural Design, 76, 2, pp. 60–69
- Hingston, Philip F., Luigi C. Barone, and Zbigniew Michalewicz, eds (2008). Design by Evolution: Advances in Evolutionary Design (Berlin; London: Springer)
- Kolarevic, Branko (2000). ' Digital Morphogenesis and Computational Architectures', in Proceedings of the 4th Conference of Congreso Iberoamericano de Grafica Digital, SIGRADI 2000 - Construindo (n)o Espaço Digital (Constructing the Digital Space), Rio de Janeiro (Brazil) 25–28 September 2000, ed. by José Ripper Kós, Andréa Pessoa Borde and Diana Rodriguez Barros, pp. 98–103.
- Leach, Neil (2009). 'Digital Morphogenesis', Architectural Design, 79, 1, pp. 32–37
- Lynn, Greg (1999). Animate Form (New York: Princeton Architectural Press)
- Lynn, Greg (1998). Folds, Bodies & Blobs: Collected Essays (Bruxelles: La Lettre volée)
- Menges, Achim (2007). 'Computational Morphogenesis: Integral Form Generation and Materialization Processes', in Proceedings of Em‘body’ing Virtual Architecture: The Third International Conference of the Arab Society for Computer Aided Architectural Design (ASCAAD 2007), 28–30 November 2007, Alexandria, Egypt, ed. by Ahmad Okeil, Aghlab Al-Attili and Zaki Mallasi, pp. 725–744
- Menges, Achim (2006). 'Polymorphism', Architectural Design, 76, 2, pp. 78–87
- Ottchen, Cynthia (2009). 'The Future of Information Modelling and the End of Theory: Less is Limited, More is Different', Architectural Design, 79, 2, pp. 22–27
- Prusinkiewicz, Przemyslaw, and Aristid Lindenmayer (2004). The Algorithmic Beauty of Plants (New York: Springer-Verlag)
- Sabin, Jenny E. and Peter Lloyd Jones (2008). 'Nonlinear Systems Biology and Design: Surface Design', in Proceedings of the 28th Annual Conference of the Association for Computer Aided Design in Architecture (ACADIA), Silicon + Skin: Biological Processes and Computation, Minneapolis 16–19 October 2008, ed. by Andrew Kudless, Neri Oxman and Marc Swackhamer, pp. 54–65
- Sevaldson, Birger (2005). Developing Digital Design Techniques: Investigations on Creative Design Computing (PhD, Oslo School of Architecture)
- Sevaldson, Birger (2000). 'Dynamic Generative Diagrams', in Promise and Reality: State of the Art versus State of Practice in Computing for the Design and Planning Process. 18th eCAADe Conference Proceedings, ed. by Dirk Donath (Weimar: Bauhaus Universität), pp. 273–276
- Steadman, Philip (2008). The Evolution of Designs: Biological Analogy in Architecture and the Applied Arts (New York: Routledge)
- Tierney, Therese (2007). Abstract Space: Beneath the Media Surface (Oxon: Taylor & Francis), p. 116
- Weinstock, Michael (2006). 'Self-Organisation and the Structural Dynamics of Plants', Architectural Design, 76, 2, pp. 26–33
- Weinstock, Michael (2006). 'Self-Organisation and Material Constructions', Architectural Design, 76, 2, pp. 34–41
