= Pia Ednie-Brown =

Australian architect and academic

Pia Ednie-Brown is an Australian architectural theorist, researcher, and creative practitioner. She is also Professor of Architecture and Chair of Creative Practice Research at the School of Architecture and Built Environment, University of Newcastle, NSW, Australia. Pia maintains the creative research practice onomatopoeia, established in 2000, and leads the cross-institutional Affective Environments Laboratory.

== Early life and family ==
Ednie-Brown grew up in Perth, Western Australia. She completed her Bachelor of Architecture at the University of Western Australia in 1990.

== Career ==
Ednie-Brown completed her doctoral thesis The Aesthetics of Emergence at RMIT in 2008 through the multi-disciplinary SIAL (Spatial Information Architecture Laboratory), where she also taught and was engaged as a researcher. Between 2009 and 2011, she led an Australian Research Council Discovery project (with Mark Burry and others). Her early primary research concerns lay in emergent design and digital practices. She is interested in practice-based research as well, and organised a symposium called Practice in Research/Research in Practice at Bond University in 2017.

Her "Avery Green", a small terrace house extensions and renovation in Melbourne designed as part of Ednie-Brown's creative practice, onomatopoeia, is an investigation into ideas about nonhuman personhood, transformation and ownership. Analogous to the protected area Te Urewera, Ednie-Brown conceived of the house as self-owned, having personhood, and designed it to correspond with the local ecology and geology.

She served on the editorial board of Fibreculture journal, an open source academic journal dedicated to the contexts philosophy and politics of contemporary media technologies and events. She is on the advisory board of Inflexions, a journal for research creation, an open-access journal for research-creation sponsored by the Sense Lab.

Pia was previously an associate professor in the School of Architecture at RMIT University, Melbourne, Australia, where she taught and researched extensively.

== Awards ==
- awarded Australian Council of Graduate Research National Award for Excellence in Graduate Leadership, 2018
- awarded RMIT University Award for Excellence – Graduate Research Leadership, 2017
- PhD shortlisted with three others for RIBA Presidents Medal: Outstanding Thesis, 2008
- Honorary Mention in Prix Ars Electronica 2005, for Intimate Transactions, multi-user interactive installation, 2005
- 10th Annual BHERT Award: awarded to the Telstra Home Team at the Interactive Information Institute (of which she was a team member in 1999) for "Outstanding Achievement in Collaboration in Education and Training," 2000

== Notable events and exhibitions ==
- 'Letters to the Mayor' group show, 2014, Storefront for Art & Architecture, New York City, United States

== Books ==
- The Innovation Imperative: Architectures of Vitality, (with Mark Burry, Andrew Burrow) (eds). Architectural Design Profile No 221, H. Castle (series ed.), London: Wiley, 2013. ISBN 978-1-119-97865-7
- Plastic Green: designing for environmental transformation, (ed.), RMIT Publishing, Melbourne, 2009. ISBN 9781921426070
