= Richard Moreta Castillo =

American architect (born 1965)

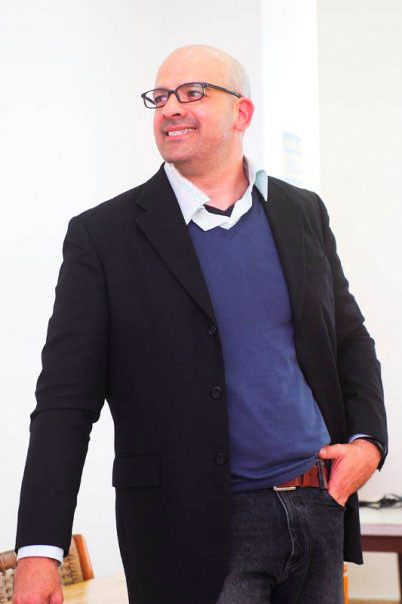
- Born: 1965 (age 60–61); New York City, New York, U.S.
- Occupations: Architect, urban planner, industrial designer, artist, educator, diplomat
- Years active: 1986–present

Richard Moreta Castillo (born 1965) is an American–Dominican architect, urban planner, industrial designer, artist, educator, and diplomat. He is the founder and CEO of Richard’s Architecture + Design, Inc. (RA+D), known for his eco-architecture, digital design, and sustainable urban projects across several continents.

== Early life and education ==
Richard Moreta Castillo was born in New York City in 1965 and raised in the Dominican Republic. He began painting as a child and reportedly won a national art competition at the age of five and was mentored by Dominican artist Nidia Serra. He studied figure drawing and oil painting at the DGBA – Escuela Nacional de Artes Visuales in Santo Domingo and in 1986 earned a Bachelor of Arts in Architecture and Urban Planning from Universidad Nacional Pedro Henríquez Ureña (UNPHU) and Universidad Central del Este (UCE).

== Advanced studies and academic formation ==
Moreta pursued further education in the United States — attending Miami Dade College, the U.S. Army Corps of Engineers training, Rollins College, and the University of South Florida.

In 2002, he completed a Dottorato in Design at Politecnico di Milano’s postgraduate school Futurarium (affiliated with NABA) under Alessandro Guerriero. He also took graduate-level coursework at the Institute for European Urban Studies at Bauhaus University, Weimar, Germany.

== Professional development ==
During the 1990s, Moreta participated in Studio Radiosity, linked to the Memphis design movement and including figures like Guerriero, Alessandro Mendini, and Ettore Sottsass.

== Career ==
=== (HOK) Hellmuth, Obata & Kassabaum (2001) ===
He joined global architecture firm HOK in 2001, to work as an architect for international projects.

=== GMZ‑Design (2002) ===
In 2002, Moreta co-founded GMZ‑Design in Miami with Victor Gane. The firm specialized in “high-tech modernism” and digital design. Its projects included the Infinity Tower and Rolex Tower in Dubai.

=== Arquitectonica (2004) ===
Moreta served as project designer at Arquitectonica, a major architecture firm based in Miami. While there, he contributed to several high-end residential and commercial towers.

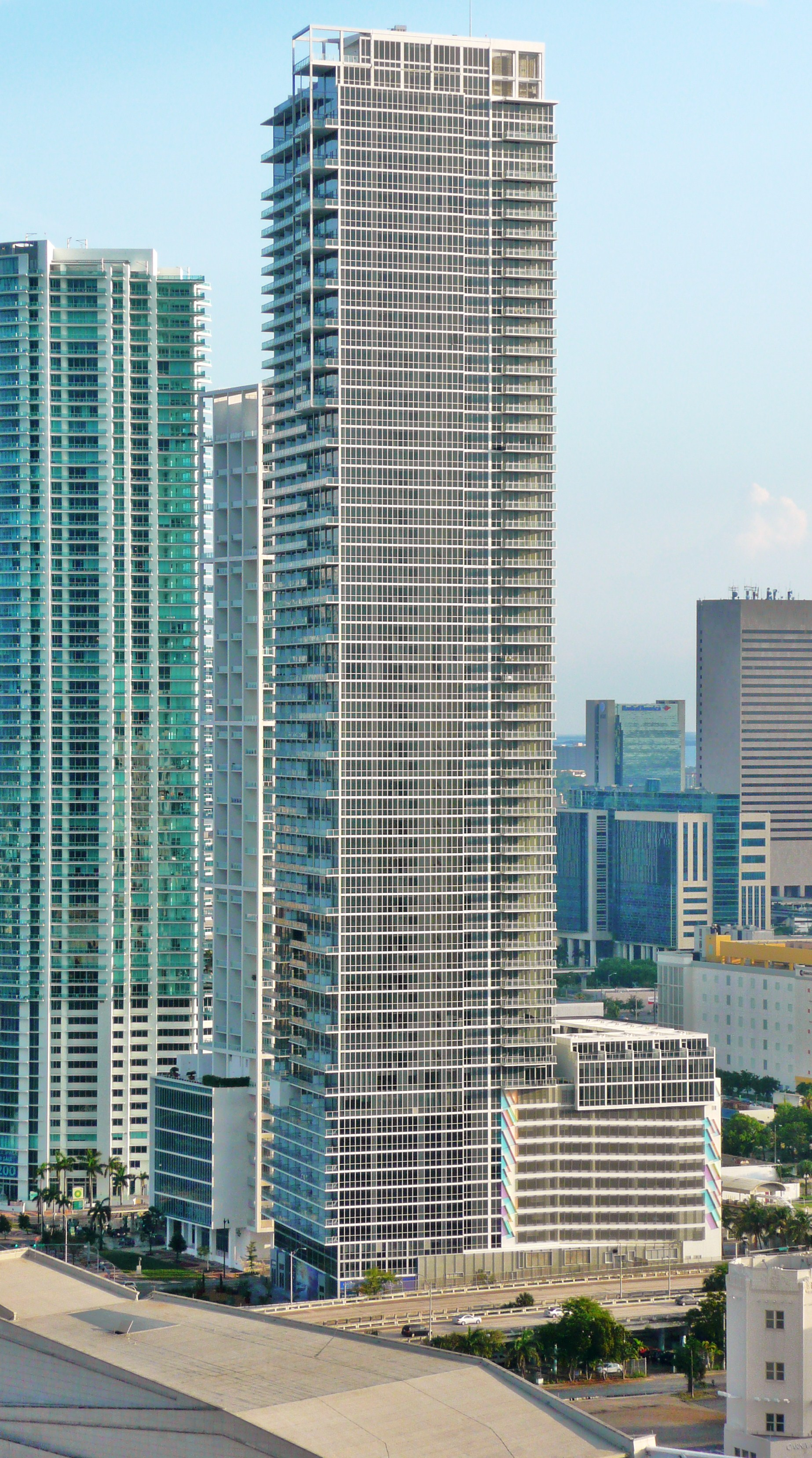
Marquis, a residential building in Miami, Florida, United States. Arch. Richard Moreta, Project Designer, 2010. Team: ARQUITECTONICA.

=== (RA+D) Richard’s Architecture + Design (2006) ===
In 2006, Moreta founded his own firm, RA+D. His studio focuses on public space interventions, sustainable design, and digital urbanism.

==== Notable projects ====
- Grand Cancún Eco‑Platform, Cancún, Mexico – An offshore, self-sustaining marine city designed to clean ocean waters and function as a zero-emissions green tourism hub.
- Odeón Tower, Shenyang, China – A digitally designed eco-building finalist in the 2009 Radical Innovation for Hospitality awards.
- Solaris, Richard Moreta was awarded "Honorable Mention" as one of the "next 7" 2015 most influential architects globally according to ARCH 20, for his Solaris project, a futuristic satellite and airship shelter complex designed in response to possible nuclear devastation in Russia.

== Design philosophy ==
Moreta combines futuristic digital modeling with sustainability principles. His “green architecture” integrates renewable energy, intelligent façades, and water treatment systems, aiming for carbon neutrality.

He argues that architecture must "respond to performance": a vision that combines functionality, cultural context and environmental effectiveness, overcoming traditional paradigms.

== Recognition ==
- Winner of the National Architecture Prize of the Dominican Republic (2012) for the Grand Cancún project.
- Featured in Design Swan, Inhabitat, Undo.net, Listín Diario, and Diario Libre for visionary digital and sustainable designs.

== Academic and diplomatic roles ==
Moreta has taught at Bauhaus-Universität Weimar and served as a visiting professor and lecturer internationally. He is also President of Green Container International Aid, which promotes humanitarian architecture using recycled shipping containers.

== See also ==
- Sustainable architecture
- Digital architecture
