= SIGraDi =

The Sociedad Iberoamericana de Gráfica Digital, SIGraDi (Iberoamerican Society of Digital Graphics) gathers researchers, educators and professionals in architecture, urban design, communication design, Product Design and Art whose work involves the new digital media.

It is an organization sister to ACADIA, eCAADe, CAADRIA and ASCAAD.

SIGraDi organizes a yearly congress when recent digital technologies and applications are presented and debated.

== Annual congress ==
SIGraDi congresses are intended as a region wide effort for the interchange of experiences, debate of our disciplines' advancements and the creation of references for the iberoamerican groups involved in digital media applied to education, research and professional practice

=== SIGraDi Congresses ===
The annual SIGraDi congress is the main event organised under auspices of the association. It is organised by a member in good standing, who volunteers for the organisation. The organiser is supported by members of the International Executive Committee.

During the years, SIGraDi has developed the policy to circulate the conference location in such a way that southern, central and northern areas of Latin America and Iberoamerica are reached regularly. In the past years, the following SIGraDi Congresses have been organised.

Year	Place	Institution	Theme
1997	Buenos Aires	Universidad de Buenos Aires	No subject
1998	Mar del Plata	Universidad Nacional de Mar del Plata	No subject
1999	Montevideo	Universidad de la República	No subject
2000	Rio de Janeiro	Universidade Federal do Rio de Janeiro	Construindo (n)o Espaço Digital
2001	Concepción	Universidad del Bio Bio	No subject
2002	Caracas	Universidad Central de Venezuela	No subject
2003	Rosario	Universidad Nacional de Rosario	Cultura Digital y Diferenciación
2004	São Leopoldo	Universidade do Vale do Rio dos Sinos	El Sentido y el Universo Digital
2005	Lima	Universidad Peruana de Ciencias Aplicadas	Visión y Visualización
2006	Santiago	Universidad de Chile	Post Digital
2007	México, D. F.	Universidad La Salle	La Comunicación en la Comunidad Visual
2008	La Habana	Instituto Superior Politécnico José Antonio Echeverría	Gráfica Digital e Informática Aplicada: Cooperación, Integración y Desarrollo
2009	São Paulo	Universidade Presbiteriana Mackenzie	De lo Moderno a lo Digital: Desafios de una Transición
2010	Bogotá	Universidad de Los Andes	Disrupción, modelación y construcción: Dialogos cambiantes
2011	Santa Fe	Universidad Nacional del Litoral	Cultura Aumentada
2012	Fortaleza	Universidade Federal do Ceará	Forma(in)formación
2013	Valparaiso	Universidad Técnica Federico Santa María	Knowledge-based Design
2014	Montevideo	Universidad de la República	Design in Freedom
2015	Santa Catarina	Universidade Federal de Santa Catarina	Información de Proyecto para la interacción
2016	Buenos Aires	Universidad de Buenos Aires	Crowdthinking
2017	Concepción	Universidad de Concepción	Resilience Design
2018	São Carlos	Universidade de São Paulo	Technopolitics
2019	Porto	University of Porto	Architecture in the Age of the 4th Industrial Revolution
2020	Medellin	Universidade Pontifícia Bolivariana	Transformative Design
2021	Online Event	SIGraDi Executive International Committee; Advisory Committee	Designing Possibilities
2022	Peru	Universidad Peruana de Ciencias Aplicadas	Critical Appropriations
2023	Punta del Este	Universidad de la República Uruguay	Accelerated Landscapes
2024	Barcelona	Universitat International de Catalunya	Biodigital Intelligent Systems
2025	Córdoba	Universidad Nacional de Córdoba	Meta Responsive Approaches
