= Association for Computer Aided Design in Architecture =

American nonprofit organization

Association for Computer Aided Design In Architecture
- Abbreviation: ACADIA
- Founded: 1981
- Tax ID no.: 99-0267393
- Legal status: 501(c)(3) nonprofit organization
- Headquarters: Fargo, North Dakota, United States
- President: Marc Swackhamer
- Revenue: $277,631 (2014)
- Expenses: $266,199 (2014)
- Employees: 0 (2014)
- Website: www.acadia.org

The Association for Computer Aided Design In Architecture (ACADIA) is a 501(c)(3) non-profit organization active in the area of computer-aided architectural design (CAAD).

== Mission statement ==
Begun in 1981, the organization's objectives are recorded in its bylaws:

"ACADIA was formed for the purpose of facilitating communication and information exchange regarding the use of computers in architecture, planning and building science. A particular focus is education and the software, hardware and pedagogy involved in education."

"The organization is also committed to the research and development of computer aides that enhance design creativity, rather than simply production, and that aim at contributing to the construction of humane physical environments."

== Membership ==
Membership is open to anyone who subscribes to the objectives of the organization, including architects, educators, and software developers, whether resident in North America or not. An online membership registration form and directory is available via the organization.

The organization is primarily governed by the elected Board of Directors. The organization is led by the elected President, who presides over Board of Directors meetings, but does not vote except in the case of a tie.

=== Presidents (elected) ===
Years	President	Number of years serving
1981	Charles M. Eastman	1
1982-1983	John Wade	2
1984	Chris Yessios	1
1985	Yehuda Kalay	1
1986	Elizabeth Bollinger	1
1987	Patricia McIntosh	1
1988	Robert E. Johnson	1
1989	Pamela J. Bancroft	1
1990	John McIntosh	1
1991	J. Peter Jordan	1
1992	Larry O. Degelman	1
1993	Skip Van Wyk	1
1994	M. Stephen Zdepski	1
1995	Karen M. Kensek	1
1996	Glenn Goldman	1
1997	Branko Kolarevic	1
1998	Douglas E. Noble	1
1999	Brian Johnson	1
2000	Mark Clayton	1
2001-2002	Ganapathy Mahalingam	2
2003-2004	Kevin Klinger	2
2005-2006	Wassim Jabi	2
2007-2008	Mahesh Senagala	2
2009	Nancy Cheng	1
2010-2012	Aron Temkin	3
2013-2015	Michael Fox	3
2016-2017	Jason Kelly Johnson	2
2018-2020	Kathy Velikov	3
2021-2022	Jenny E. Sabin	2
2023-2024	Shelby Doyle	2
2025-2026	Marc Swackhamer	2
2027 President-elect	Biayna Bogosian	

== Activities ==
=== Annual conference ===
ACADIA sponsors an annual national conference, held in the autumn of each year at a different site in North America. Papers for the conferences undergo extensive blind review before being accepted for presentation (and publication). Membership is not a prerequisite for submission of a paper.

	Year	City, state/province	Country	Host university	Conference theme
Founding	1981	Pittsburgh, Pennsylvania	USA	Carnegie-Mellon University	N/A
1st	1982	Blacksburg, Virginia	USA	Virginia Tech	N/A
2nd	1983	Columbus, Ohio	USA	Ohio State University	N/A
3rd	1984	Troy, New York	USA	Rensselaer Polytechnic Institute	N/A
4th	1985	Tempe, Arizona	USA	Arizona State University	ACADIA Workshop '85
5th	1986	Houston, Texas	USA	University of Houston	Architectural Education, Research and Practice in the Next Decade
6th	1987	Raleigh, North Carolina	USA	North Carolina State University	Integrating Computers into the Architectural Curriculum
7th	1988	Ann Arbor, Michigan	USA	University of Michigan	Computing in Design Education
8th	1989	Gainesville, Florida	USA	University of Florida	New Ideas and Directions for the 1990s
9th	1990	Big Sky, Montana	USA	Montana State University	From Research to Practice
10th	1991	Los Angeles, California	USA	University of California at Los Angeles	Reality and Virtual Reality
11th	1992	Charleston, South Carolina	USA	Clemson University	Mission - Method - Madness
12th	1993	Texas	USA	Texas A&M University	Education and Practice: The Critical Interface
13th	1994	Saint Louis, Missouri	USA	Washington University in St. Louis	Reconnecting
14th	1995	Seattle, Washington	USA	University of Washington	Computing in Design - Enabling, Capturing and Sharing Ideas
15th	1996	Tucson, Arizona	USA	University of Arizona	Design Computation: Collaboration, Reasoning, Pedagogy
16th	1997	Cincinnati, Ohio	USA	University of Cincinnati	Design and Representation
17th	1998	Québec City, Québec	Canada	Université Laval	Digital Design Studios: Do Computers Make a Difference?
18th	1999	Salt Lake City, Utah	USA	University of Utah	Media and Design Process
19th	2000	Washington D.C	USA	The Catholic University of America	Eternity, Infinity and Virtuality in Architecture
20th	2001	Buffalo, New York	USA	The State University of New York at Buffalo	Reinventing the Discourse - How Digital Tools Help Bridge and Transform Research, Education and Practice in Architecture
21st	2002	Pomona, California	USA	California Polytechnic State University	Thresholds - Design, Research, Education and Practice, in the Space Between the Physical and the Virtual
22nd	2003	Indianapolis, Indiana	USA	Ball State University	Connecting >> Crossroads of Digital Discourse
23rd	2004	Cambridge, Ontario	Canada	University of Toronto & University of Waterloo	Fabrication: Examining the Digital Practice of Architecture
24th	2005	Savannah, Georgia	USA	Savannah School of Architecture and Design	Smart Architecture: Integration of Digital and Building Technologies
25th	2006	Louisville, Kentucky	USA	University of Kentucky, Lexington	Synthetic Landscapes
26th	2007	Halifax, Nova Scotia	Canada	Dalhousie University & Nova Scotia College of Art and Design & Canadian Design Research Network	Expanding Bodies
27th	2008	Minneapolis, Minnesota	USA	University of Minnesota	Silicon + Skin: Biological Processes and Computation
28th	2009	Chicago, Illinois	USA	School of the Art Institute of Chicago	reForm(): Building a Better Tomorrow
29th	2010	New York, New York	USA	The Cooper Union & Pratt Institute	Life in:Formation
30th	2011	Calgary(workshops) and Banff(conference), Alberta	Canada	University of Calgary	Integration Through Computation
31st	2012	San Francisco, California	USA	California College of the Arts & UCSF	Synthetic Digital Ecologies
32nd	2013	Cambridge, Ontario	Canada	University of Waterloo	Adaptive Architecture
33rd	2014	Los Angeles, California	USA	University of Southern California	Design Agency
34th	2015	Cincinnati, Ohio	USA	University of Cincinnati	Computational Ecologies: Design in the Anthropocene
35th	2016	Ann Arbor, Michigan	USA	University of Michigan	Posthuman Frontiers: Data, Designers And Cognitive Machines
36th	2017	Cambridge, Massachusetts	USA	Massachusetts Institute of Technology	Disciplines & Disruptions
37th	2018	Mexico City, Mexico	Mexico	Universidad Iberoamericana	Re/Calibration: On Imprecision and Infidelity
38th	2019	Austin, Texas	USA	University of Texas at Austin	Ubiquity and Autonomy
39th	2020	Online, Global	Global	ACADIA	Distributed Proximities
40th	2021	Online, Global	Global	ACADIA	Realignments: Toward Critical Computation
41th	2022	Philadelphia, Pennsylvania	USA	University of Pennsylvania	Hybrids & Haecceities
42nd	2023	Denver, Colorado	USA	University of Colorado Denver	Habits of the Anthropocene
43rd	2024	Calgary(workshops) and Banff(conference), Alberta	Canada	University of Calgary	Designing Change
44th	2025	Miami, Florida	USA	Florida International University + University of Miami	Computing for Resiliance
45th	2026	Detroit, Michigan	USA	Lawrence Technological University	Humanism Recoded

=== Proceedings ===
Each year the conference papers are gathered into a proceedings publication which is distributed to members, and available to the public via the open access database CumInCAD.

=== Awards ===
Started in 1998, ACADIA Awards of Excellence are "the highest award that can be achieved in the field of architectural computing". The awards are given in areas of practice, teaching, research and service, with at most one award in each category per year. Past awards have recognized various significant contributors to the field of architectural computing.

The current awards given annually or biannually are the Lifetime Achievement Award, the Digital Practice Award of Excellence, the Innovative Academic Program Award of Excellence, the Innovative Research Award of Excellence, the Society Award for Leadership, and the Teaching Award of Excellence.

==== Lifetime Achievement Award ====
Year	Recipient	Affiliation
2021	Wolf dPrix	Coop Himmelb(l)au
2016	Elizabeth Diller	Diller, Scofidio and Renfro / Princeton University
2014	Zaha Hadid	Zaha Hadid Architects

==== Innovative Research Award of Excellence ====
Year	Recipient	Affiliation
2023	Joseph Choma	Florida Atlantic University School of Architecture
2022	Felecia Ann Davis	Pennsylvania State UniversityPennsylvania State University
2021	Caitlin Mueller	Massachusetts Institute of Technology
2020	Sean Ahlquist	Taubman College of Architecture and Urban Planning
2019	Jose Sanchez	Plethora Project
2018	Madeline Gannon	NVIDIA Robotics
2017	Wesley McGee	Matter Design
2016	Andrew Payne	Autodesk
2015	Skylar Tibbits	Massachusetts Institute of Technology
2014	Martin Bechtold	Harvard University Graduate School of Design
2013	Elena Manferdini	Atelier Manferdini and SCI-Arc
2012	David Rutten	Robert McNeel and Associates
2011	Ellen Do	Georgia Institute of Technology
2010	Kostas Terzidis	Harvard University Graduate School of Design
2009	Paul Coates	University of East London
2008	Robert Woodbury	Simon Fraser University
2007	Branko Kolarevic	University of Calgary
2006	Mark Burry	The Royal Melbourne Institute of Technology

==== Digital Practice Award of Excellence ====
Year	Recipient (person or firm)	Affiliation
2023	Nader Tehrani	NADAAA
2022	Award category omitted	
2021	Alvin Huang	Synthesis Design + Architecture and University of Southern California
2020	Jessica Rosenkrantz co-founder of Nervous System and Jesse Louis-Rosenberg co-founder of Nervous System	Nervous system
2019	Roland Snooks	Studio Roland Snooks and The Royal Melbourne Institute of Technology
2018	Jenny Wu and Dwayne Oyler	Oyler Wu Collaborative
2017	Lisa Iwamoto and Craig Scott	IwamotoScott Architecture and University of California, Berkeley and California College of the Arts
2016	Ron Rael and Virginia San Fratello	Emerging Objects and University of California, Berkeley and San Jose State University
2015	Kieran Timberlake	KieranTimberlake
2014	Jenny Sabin	Jenny Sabin Studio
2013	Cecil Balmond	Balmond Studio
2012	Gehry Technologies – accepted by Dennis Shelden	Frank Gehry Technologies
2011	Phillip Beesley	Phillip Beesley Architects and University of Waterloo
2010	Award category omitted	
2009	Fabio Gramazio and Matthias Kohler	Gramazio Kohler Architects
2008	Fabian Scheurer	Design to Production
2007	Achim Menges	Architectural Association School of Architecture
2006	Evan Douglis	Evan Douglis Studio

==== Society Award for Leadership ====
Year	Recipient (Academic Program)	University
2023	Kathy Velikov	Taubman College of Architecture and Urban Planning
2022	Jason Kelly Johnson	California College of the Arts and FUTUREFORMS
2021	Brian Slocum	Universidad Iberoamericana in Mexico City and tresRobots
2020	Mike Christenson	University of Minnesota
2019	Chris Yessios	Ohio State University and AutoDesSys, Inc.
2018	Sigrid Brell-Cokcan and Johannes Braumann	Association for Robots in Architecture
2017	Bob Martens	Technical University of Vienna
2016	Chuck Eastman	Georgia Institute of Technology
2015	Branko Kolarevic	University of Calgary
2014	Nancy Cheng	University of Oregon
2013	Mahesh Daas	Ball State University
2013	Award category omitted	
2012	Award category omitted	
2011	Award category omitted	
2010	Brian Johnson	University of Washington
2009	Tom Seebohm	University of Waterloo
2008	Tom Maver	Mackintosh School of Architecture
2007	Award category omitted	
2006	Robert Aish	Bentley Microsystems

==== Innovative Academic Program Award of Excellence ====
Year	Recipient (Academic Program)	University
2023	Award category omitted	
2022	Award category omitted	
2021	Award category omitted	
2020	DigitalFUTURES Program, Tongji University accepted by Philip F. Yuan, Professor and Neil Leach	DigitalFUTURES Program
2019	Master of Science in Digital and Material – accepted by Catie Newell	Taubman College of Architecture and Urban Planning
2018	Institute of Advanced Architecture Catalonia – accepted by Areti Markopoulou	Institute of Advanced Architecture Catalonia
2017	Bartlett Prospective (B-Pro) Program – accepted by Gilles Retsin and Manual Jimenez Garcia	The Bartlett School of Architecture
2016	Centre for Information Technology and Architecture (CITA) – accepted by Mette Ramsgaard Thomsen	Centre for Information Technology and Architecture (CITA)
2015	Institute for Computational Design (ICD) – accepted by Achim Menges	Institute for Computational Design (ICD)
2014	Columbia Building Intelligence Project (CBIP) – accepted by Scott Marble	Graduate School of Architecture, Planning and Preservation
2013	AADRL Design Research Laboratory – accepted by Brett Steele and Theodore Sypropoulos	London
2012	Center for Architecture Science and Ecology (CASE) – accepted by Anna Dyson	Rensselaer Polytechnic Institute and Skidmore Owings and Merrill
2011	Award category omitted	
2010	Award category omitted	
2009	Award category omitted	
2008	AA Emergent Technologies and Design – accepted by Michael Weinstock	London

== History ==
ACADIA was founded in 1981 by some of the pioneers in the field of design computation including Bill Mitchell, Chuck Eastman, and Chris Yessios. Since then, ACADIA has hosted over 40 conferences across North America and has grown into a strong network of academics and professionals in the design computation field.

== Related organizations ==
=== Sister organizations ===
There are four sister organizations around the world to provide a more accessible regional forum for discussion of computing and design. The major ones are

- CAADRIA - The Association for Computer Aided Architectural Design in Asia, since 1996.
- SIGraDi - Iberoamerican Society of Digital Graphics, since 1997.
- ASCAAD - The Arab Society for Computer Aided Architectural Design, since 2001.
- eCAADe - The Association for Education and Research in Computer-Aided Architectural Design in Europe.

=== Other related organizations ===
- CAAD Futures - Computer Aided Architectural Design Futures, since 1985.
- CUMINCAD - The Cumulative Index of Computer Aided Architectural Design, with public CumInCAD records available via an Open Archives Initiative Protocol for Metadata Harvesting (OAI-PMH) feed and records are available via multiple bibliographic archives and citation indexes online.
