= Neri Oxman =

American-Israeli designer and academic

- נרי אוקסמן
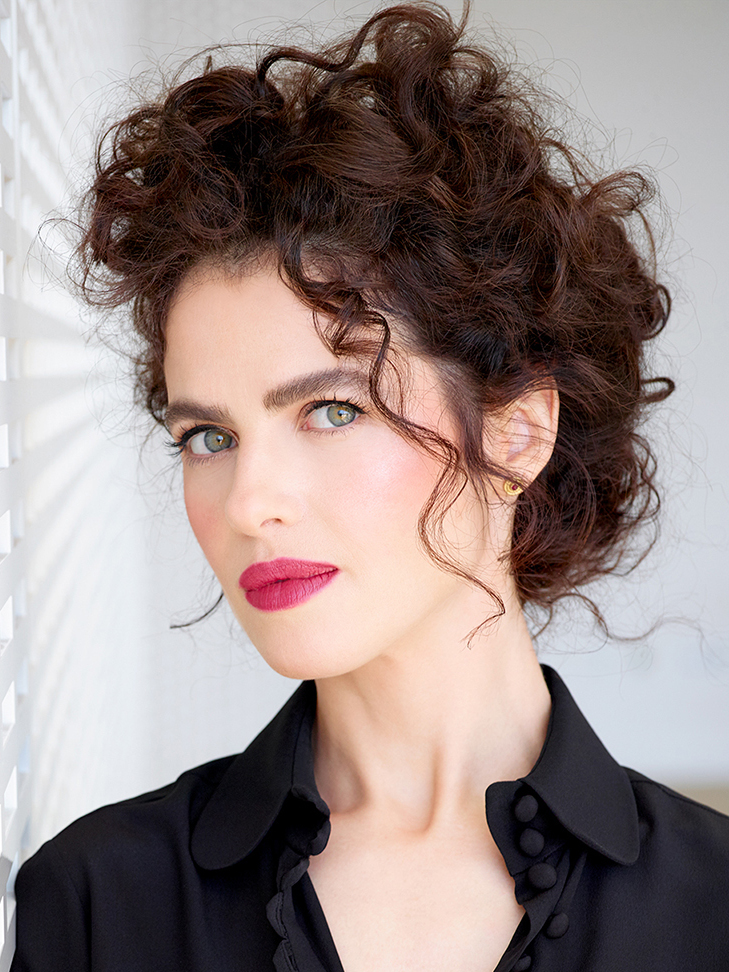
- Oxman in 2017
- Born: February 6, 1976 (age 50); Haifa, Israel
- Education: Hebrew University of Jerusalem; Israel Institute of Technology (BA); Architectural Association (MA); Massachusetts Institute of Technology (PhD)
- Occupations: Designer and academic
- Spouses: Osvaldo Golijov (m. 2011; div. 2015); Bill Ackman (m. 2019)
- Children: 1
- Mother: Rivka Oxman
- Awards: National Design Award (2018); Vilcek Prize (2014)
- Scientific career
- Fields: Architectural design
- Thesis: Material-based design computation (2010)
- Doctoral advisor: William J. Mitchell
- Military career
- Allegiance: Israel
- Branch: Israeli Air Force
- Rank: First lieutenant
- Website: oxman.com

Neri Oxman (Hebrew: נרי אוקסמן; born February 6, 1976) is an American-Israeli designer and former professor known for art that combines design, biology, computing, and materials engineering. She coined the phrase "material ecology" to define her work.

Oxman was a professor of Media Arts and Sciences at the MIT Media Lab, where she founded and led the Mediated Matter research group. She has had exhibitions at the Museum of Modern Art (MoMA), Boston's Museum of Science, SFMOMA, and the Centre Pompidou, which have her works in their permanent collections.

Many of Oxman's projects use new platforms and techniques for 3D printing and fabrication, often incorporating nature and biology. They include co-fabrication systems for building hybrid structures with silkworms, bees, and ants; a water-based fabrication platform that built structures such as Aguahoja out of chitosan; and the first 3D printer for optically transparent glass. Other projects include printed clothing, wearables, and furniture.

== Early life and education ==
Neri Oxman was born in Haifa, Israel, the daughter of architecture professors Robert and Rivka Oxman. Her sister Keren Oxman is an artist. Oxman grew up in Israel, spending time in her parents' architecture studio and at her grandmother's house.

After graduating from the Hebrew Reali School in Haifa in 1993, she served for three years in the Israeli Air Force, reaching the rank of first lieutenant. Following her military service, she attended Hebrew University's Hadassah Medical School for two years before switching to architecture. She began her architectural studies at Technion Israel Institute of Technology and finished her degree at the Architectural Association School of Architecture in London, graduating in 2004. In 2005, Oxman began Ph.D. studies in architectural design at the Massachusetts Institute of Technology, advised by William J. Mitchell. Her thesis focused on material-aware design. She graduated from the doctoral program in 2010.

== Career ==
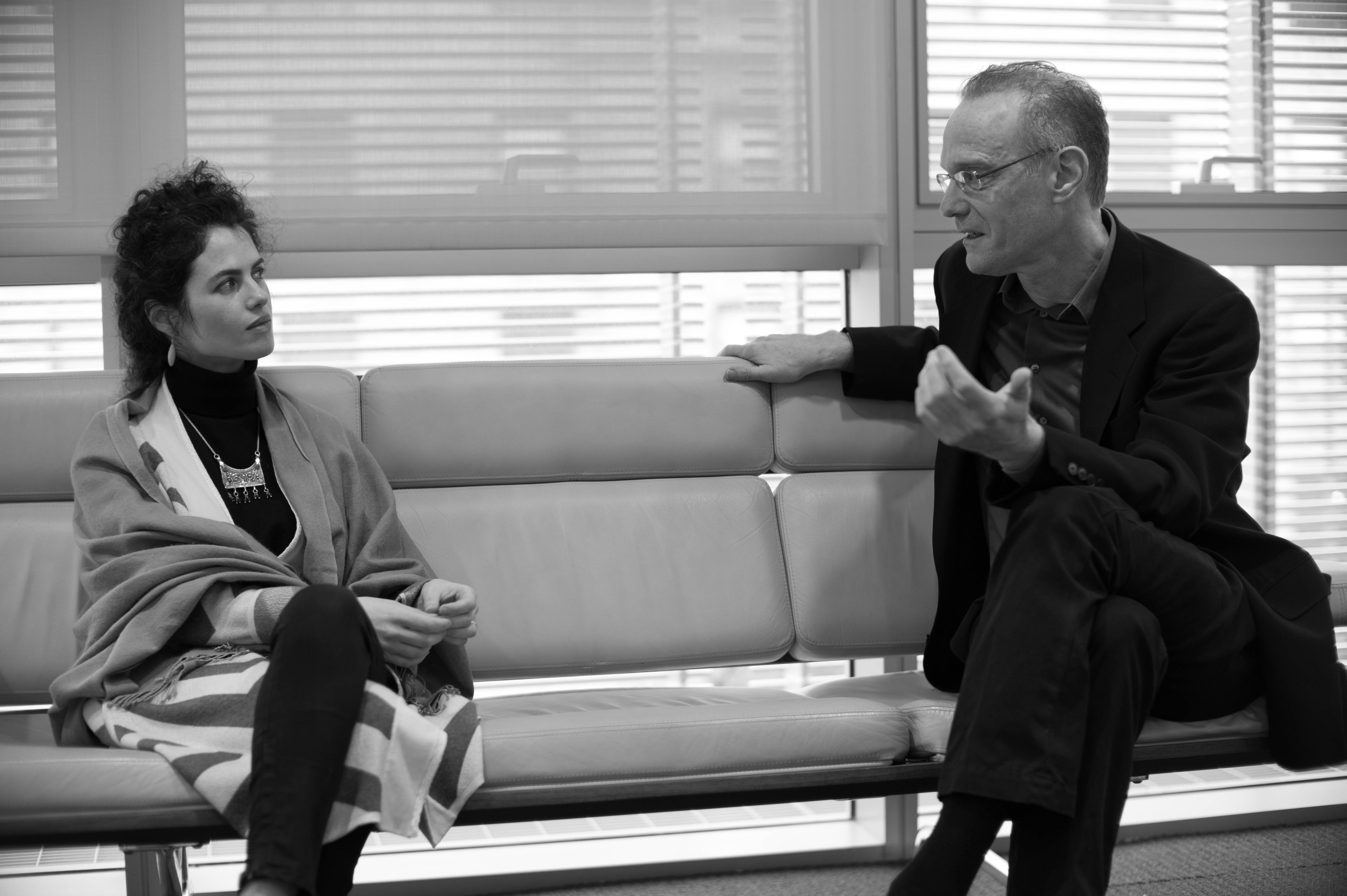
Oxman with Chuck Hoberman of Harvard Graduate School of Design

In 2006, Oxman began an interdisciplinary research project at MIT called material ecology, to experiment with generative design. She became a professor at MIT in 2010, and was given her own lab, the Mediated Matter group at MIT Media Lab. She was granted tenure at MIT in 2017.

Her research interests involve parametric and contextual design, including engineering techniques to realize those designs in various materials and contexts. Examples include creating a "skin" for buildings that can tan in the sun to create shade, and structural biodegradable polymers. She has published collaborations in biology, medicine, wearables, and the design of fabrication tools.

Her work has been mentioned as an inspiration for changing how materials and structures are designed. In 2016, she helped launch the open Journal of Design Science, an "antidisciplinary" journal which journal co-founder Joi Ito described as "working in spaces that simply do not fit into any existing academic discipline." She wrote that science, engineering, design and art are connected, with the output of each serving as input for the others.

Oxman's early projects took the form of surfaces, furniture, or objects that could be worn or put on display. Since 2013, most projects have included temporary or interactive installations, including the production process and study of its material properties. These include both mechanical processes, such as for Ocean Pavilion and Glass I, and biological ones, such as for Silk Pavilion and Synthetic Apiary.

Oxman's work has been included in the permanent collections of museums such as New York's Museum of Modern Art (MoMA), the San Francisco Museum of Modern Art (SFMOMA), the Museum of Applied Arts (MAK) in Vienna, the Smithsonian, and Boston's Museum of Fine Arts and Museum of Science. In 2020, the MoMA displayed the first exhibition of her work as its own collection.

Oxman serves on the Executive Advisory Board of the WORLD.MINDS Foundation, where she contributes to interdisciplinary conversations at the nexus of design, science, and society.

=== Mediated Matter ===
Oxman's Mediated Matter research group uses computational design, digital fabrication, 3D printing, materials science and synthetic biology for large and small structures. The group developed its own methods and printing platforms, and worked with a range of 3D production systems. Projects have ranged in scale from enclosures and large furniture, to artwork and clothes, to biocomposites, artificial valves, and DNA assembly. Production methods include taking images of a biological or natural sample, developing algorithms to produce similar structures, and developing new manufacturing processes to realize the results. Projects include wearable clothes and tools, solar-powered and biodegradable designs, new artistic techniques, and construction of surfaces, walls, coverings and load-bearing elements.

==== Organic and natural fabrication ====
The Silk Pavilion, an installation designed in 2013, was noted for its fabrication method as much as its final form. It was woven by 6,500 free-ranging silkworms on a nylon-frame dome. Experiments with the silkworms identified how they would respond to different surfaces, and what would encourage them to spin onto an existing structure rather than spinning a cocoon. The frame of a large polyhedral dome was loosely woven by a robotic arm out of thin nylon threads, and suspended in an open room. The dome was designed with gaps where it would be warmest. Silkworms were released onto the frame in waves, where they added layers of silk before being removed. This involved engineering, sericulture, and modeling sun in the room. The resulting pavilion was hung so that people could stand inside it. This was reprised in 2020 for Silk Pavilion II, installed as part of the Oxman exhibition at MoMA.

The Synthetic Apiary, a room-sized installation built in 2015, studied the behavior of bees in an indoor environment, including how they built hives in and around different structures. This was developed in collaboration with a beekeeping company, as a way of testing possible responses to colony loss, and exploring how biological niches could be integrated into buildings.

==== Wearables ====
In 2012, Oxman printed a set of body-sized wearables, Imaginary Beings, inspired by legendary creatures. She also collaborated with van Herpen and materials scientist W. Craig Carter on Anthozoa, a cape and skirt evocative of marine life.

In 2015, she designed the Wanderers collection, inspired by interplanetary exploration, in collaboration with Christoph Bader and Dominik Kolb. The collection included the Living Mushtari chestpiece, a model digestive tract filled containing a colony of microorganisms that could sustain life in harsh environments. The collection was described by Andrew Bolton as "defined by neither time nor place".

In 2016, she produced Rottlace, a 3D-printed mask for Björk, based on a 3D scan of the performer's face. Björk wore it in the world's first 360° virtual reality livestream. Oxman also developed Lazarus, a project designed to capture the wearer's last breath, and began work on Vespers, a collection of 15 death masks. The masks were divided into past, present, and future, and embedded with minerals and bacteria.

==== Environments ====
In 2014, she collaborated with Carter on Gemini, a chaise longue with a milled wood frame and 3D-printed upholstery designed for both structural and acoustical properties, designed to recreate a calming womb-like environment. It was produced with a combination of additive and subtractive printing. SFMOMA acquired the piece the next year. This work gave rise to a model for a larger scale Gemini Cinema.

The G3DP glass printing process

==== 3D printing platforms ====
Mediated Matter also prototyped new platforms and tools for printing. These included a printer that can print entire sections of rooms, a glass printer, and a quick-curing printer that can make free-standing objects without support structures.

In 2014, they developed G3DP, the first 3D printer to produce optically transparent glass. At the time, sintering 3D printers could print with glass powder, but the results were brittle and opaque. G3DP was a collaboration with MIT's Glass Lab and the Wyss Institute, emulating traditional glass working processes, with a kiln and annealing chamber. The process allowed close control of color, transparency, thickness and texture. Certain settings turned the printer into a "molten glass sewing machine". Two generations of the printer, G3DP and G3DP2, produced collections of vessels that have gone on exhibit as Glass I and Glass II.

A 10-foot glass and light sculpture printed by this platform, YET, was installed at the 2017 Milan Design Week.

Also in 2014, the group developed Aguahoja, a project involving a water-based fabrication platform that built structures out of chitosan, a curable water-soluble organic fiber similar to chitin. Structural pillars or long leaves could be made by varying how the fibers were deposited. The resulting combination of hard and soft structures could change from solid to willowy over the length of a branch or leaf, using the same base material. This was demonstrated in a pair of installations, Aguahoja I and II, featuring a central 15-foot tall sculpture resembling "enormous, folded cicada wings".

In 2016, the group developed a large-scale robotic printing system, the Digital Construction Platform (DCP), which printed polyurethane foam molds with a robot arm based on the Altec aerial work platform. DCP v2 was able to print a section of a dome 15 meters across and 4 meters high.

==== Other developments ====
Starting in 2018, the Mediated Matter lab developed the Totems project, exploring ways to extract melanin from different species and embed it in 3D-printed structures. This led to a concept for buildings with facades that respond to sunlight, such as a proposed architectural pavilion initiated by Ravi Naidoo and introduced at his Design Indaba conference.

From 2017 to 2020, a new Silk Pavilion was developed, Silk Pavilion II, exploring new potential models for gathering silk from silkworms without needing to boil cocoons and end the silkworm's lifecycle.

In 2020, the lab produced a new Aguahoja installation, Aguahoja III, identical to the first but stored in a climate-controlled gallery. This is intended to serve as a long-term control against which to compare the original, in measuring how chitosan degrades or is influenced by environmental changes. The lab stopped active work in 2021.

=== Recent work ===
Starting in 2020, Oxman's studio, Oxman Architects, has explored similar themes in their projects. They produced a documentary about their work, Nature × Humanity, which became the name of a 2022 exhibition of their work at SFMOMA.

In 2020, she created the final version of Silk Pavilion II, weaving a new pavilion in Padua, Italy in collaboration with a silkworm-rearing facility in nearby Teolo. The structure was constructed on a dissolvable hyperboloid.

In 2021, her team revisited the Synthetic Apiary, constructing a new environment for bees to build hives, printed with embedded pheromones. The resulting hive structures were analyzed by CT scans to allow digital reconstruction and provide insight into the bees' construction process. They also designed an experiment testing how bees respond to low-gravity environments, and fabricated a new type of payload module to house the experiment on a Blue Origin suborbital flight.

Oxman was the architectural consultant for Francis Ford Coppola's 2024 film Megalopolis, and her work influenced the futuristic cityscape depicted in the movie. She also makes a cameo appearance in the film.

== Controversies ==
=== Association with Jeffrey Epstein ===
In 2019, an MIT report revealed that Oxman's lab had received $125,000 from Jeffrey Epstein, part of a series of donations (including one for a "Knotty Discretionary Fund") he made to the Media Lab and its director Joi Ito. The report also revealed that in October 2015, Oxman had met in-person with Epstein, along with Ito, MIT Media Lab professor Danny Hillis, and two MIT students.

According to the Boston Globe, in 2017, "Ito requested that her design lab, which often produced donor gifts for the university, send a token of appreciation to Epstein: a grapefruit-sized, 3-D printed marble with a base that lit up. It came with a pair of gloves to avoid getting fingerprints on the surface." Oxman asked members of her lab to prepare and send the gift to Epstein, according to documents shared by an MIT employee. A graduate student in the lab raised concerns, emailing to Oxman: "Have you read the articles about this Jeff Epstein? He seems pretty shady. . . . Just wanted to point it out in case you weren't aware." Oxman replied that she was aware of Epstein's background, adding that "Jeff E." should always be "confidential", but told the student that they were not sponsored by Epstein.

In a statement to the Boston Globe in 2019, Oxman said MIT required that Epstein's donations to her lab be kept confidential, "so as to not enhance his reputation by association with MIT, and with the understanding that he would not be considered a sponsor of our group’s research or have any involvement in how the funds were spent."

=== Plagiarism allegations ===
In late 2023, Oxman's husband, Bill Ackman, joined calls to remove Claudine Gay as president of Harvard over plagiarism accusations. Shortly after, journalists at Business Insider published articles alleging Oxman plagiarized from a range of sources, including from Wikipedia, in her 2010 PhD dissertation and three journal articles. The alleged plagiarism included several passages copied almost verbatim from the Wikipedia articles on weaving, principle of minimum energy, constitutive equation, heat flux, raster graphics, and manifold, the duplication of an image from the article on raster graphics without attribution, and footnotes copied nearly verbatim from Wolfram MathWorld and the website for the design software package Rhinoceros 3D.

Oxman subsequently apologized for what she called "citation errors". Business Insider's owner Axel Springer said that it investigated the outlet's "processes" after Ackman questioned their motives, and stood by its reporting.

== Design philosophy ==
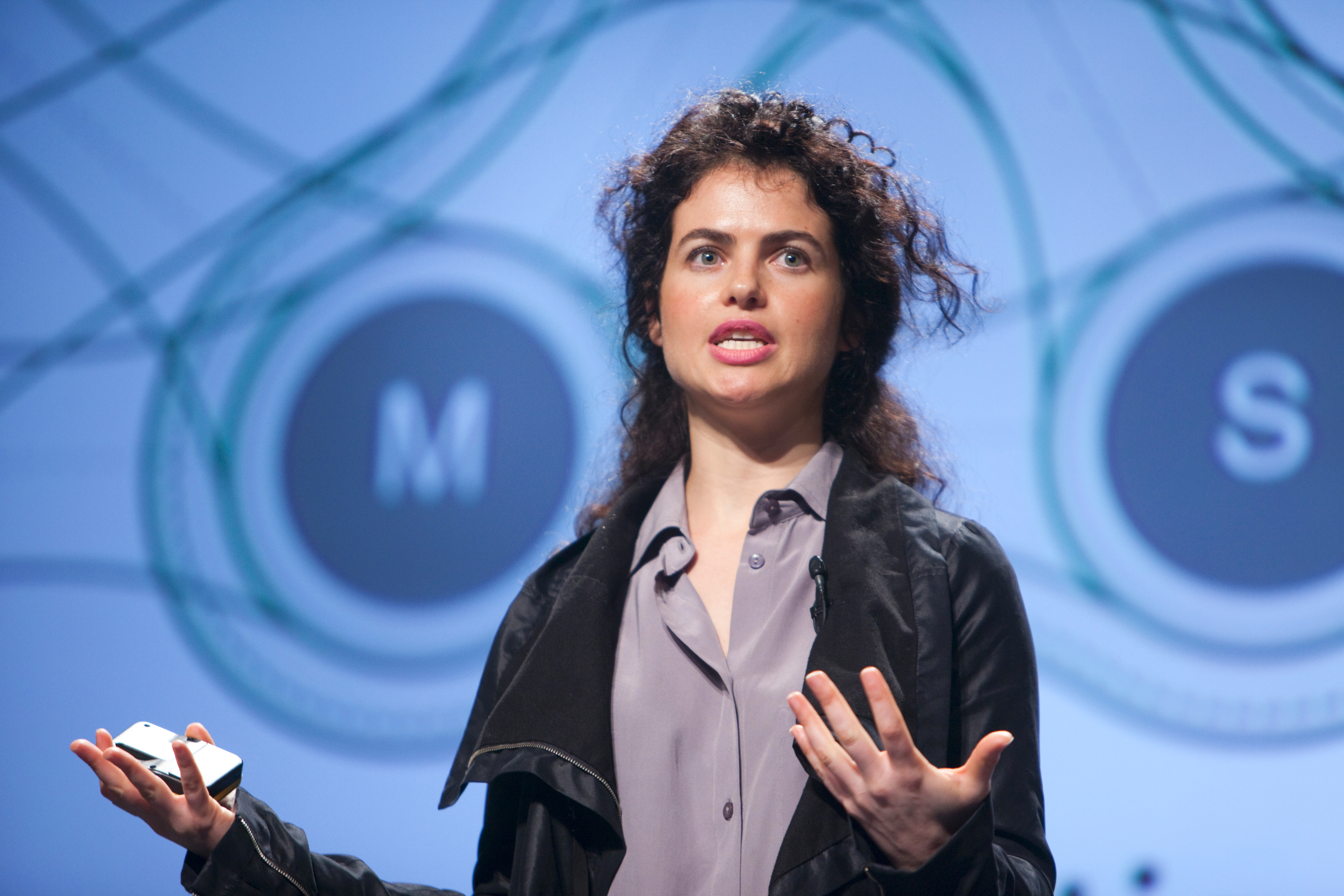
Oxman at Pop!Tech 2009

Oxman's philosophy of material ecology was developed in 2006 while a graduate student at MIT. It combines 3D printing techniques with biology, engineering, materials science, and computer science to create objects and structures through growth and without assembly. She proposed developing a material ecology with "holistic products, characterized by property gradients and multi-functionality" – placing humanity in harmony with nature, in contrast to assembly lines and "a world made of parts".

She described her work as shifting "from consuming nature as a geological resource to editing it as a biological one." This includes using biological shapes as inspiration, textures, and even fabrication, such as the glowing bacteria in Mushtari and the silkworms in the Silk Pavilion. Museum of Modern Art curator Paola Antonelli described Oxman's work as a way to "decipher nature's myriad [design] lessons and render them digitally for future application at all scales."

Oxman's approach to form generation and environmental design is cited by rapid prototypers in other fields, and gave a popular 2015 TED talk on material ecology. In 2019, the Netflix docu-series Abstract: The Art of Design featured her work in its second season.

== Personal life ==
Oxman was previously married to Argentine composer Osvaldo Golijov. In 2019, she married investor and hedge fund manager Bill Ackman, with whom she has a daughter. They are co-trustees of the Pershing Square Foundation.

== Works ==
=== Early works ===
Oxman's early work focused on 3D printing, including projects like Carpal Skin, which used the profile of pain for a person with carpal tunnel syndrome to ease their discomfort, and Monocoque (2007), a demonstration of how a printed structure could support its weight via its exterior skin rather than interior supports. This required a printer that could simultaneously print multiple materials with different structural properties, a process she named "variable property rapid prototyping". In 2008, futurist Bruce Sterling called her work "shatteringly different from anything before". Later works involved fabrication by animals or by natural processes.

In 2016, Oxman worked with Björk to create a mask based on the singer's face, and worked with Dutch fashion designer Iris van Herpen to 3D-print a collection of wearable couture.

=== Selected works ===
- Cartesian Wax, Monocoque, Raycounting (2007, MoMA)
- Carpal Skin (2010, Museum of Science)
- Imaginary Beings (2012, Centre Pompidou)
- Silk Pavilion I (2013) and II (2020), installation
- Anthozoa (2013, MFA), couture dress
- Gemini (2015, SF MoMA), acoustical chaise
- Wanderers collection (2015, incl. Living Mushtari)
- Glass I (2014), 3D printer & glasswork
- Rottlace (2016), stage mask
- Aguahoja I & II (2017–2019), biocomposite structures

=== Gallery ===
Art, surfaces, and furniture

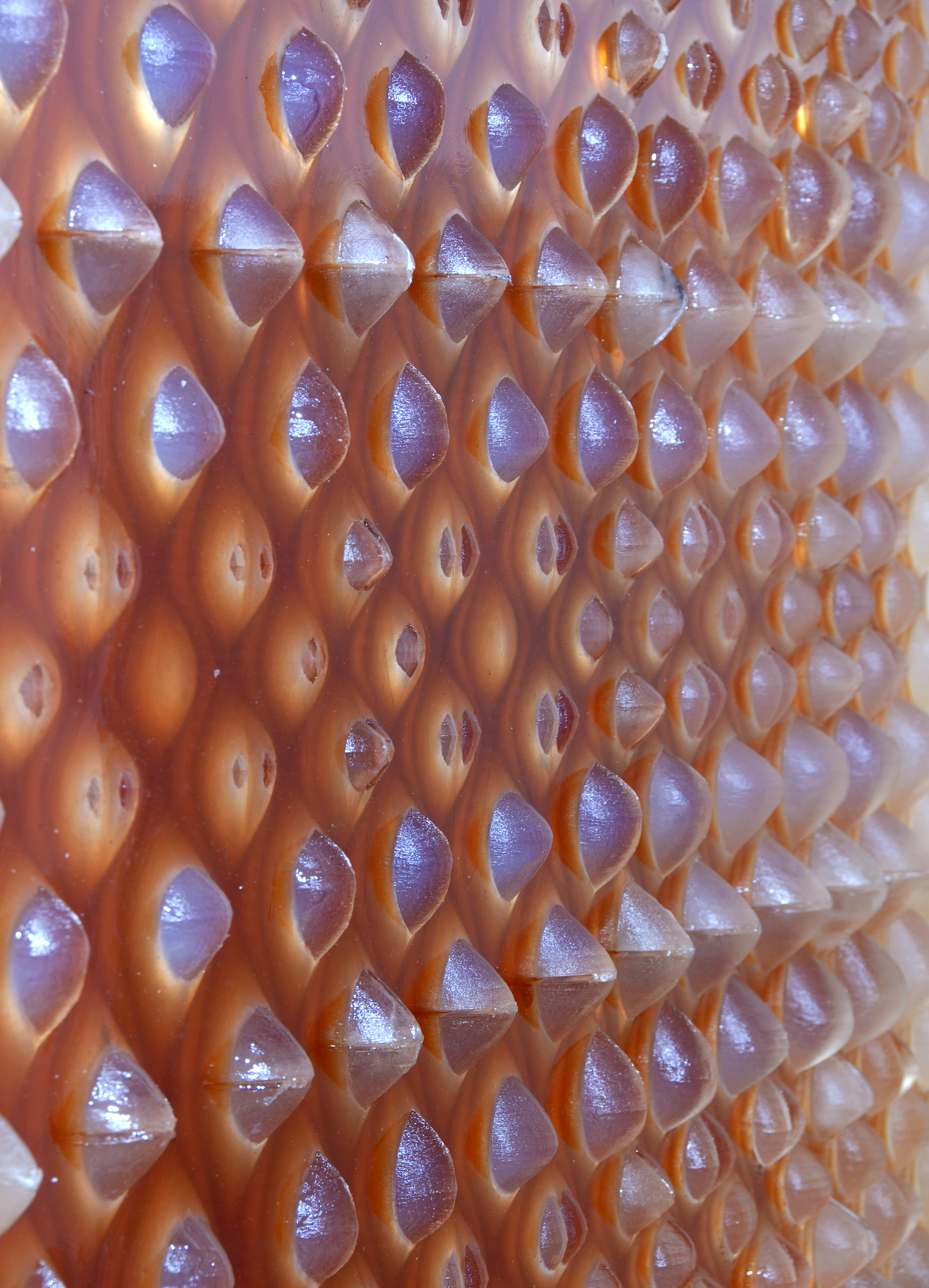
Cartesian Wax surface

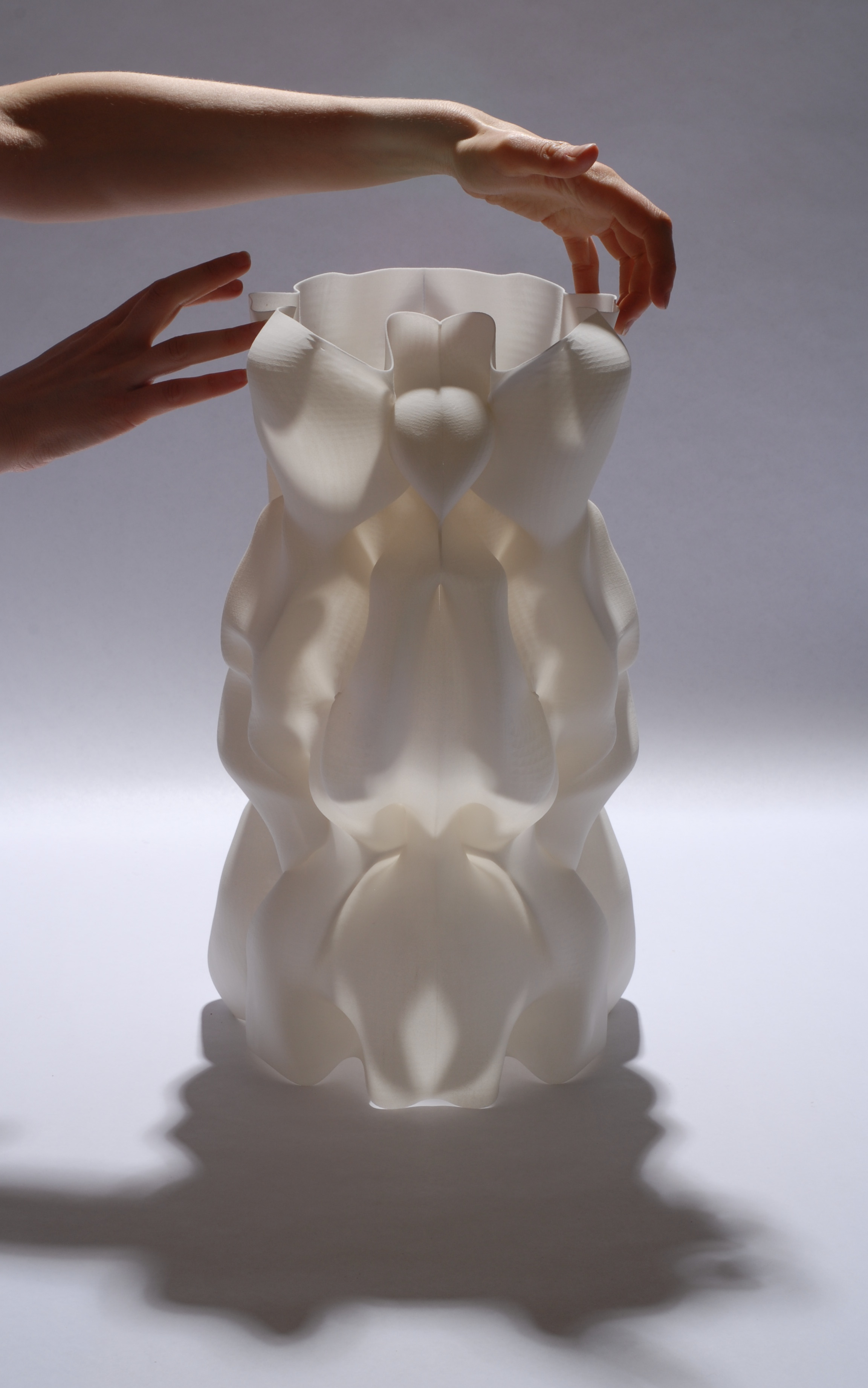
Raycounting, multiply lit

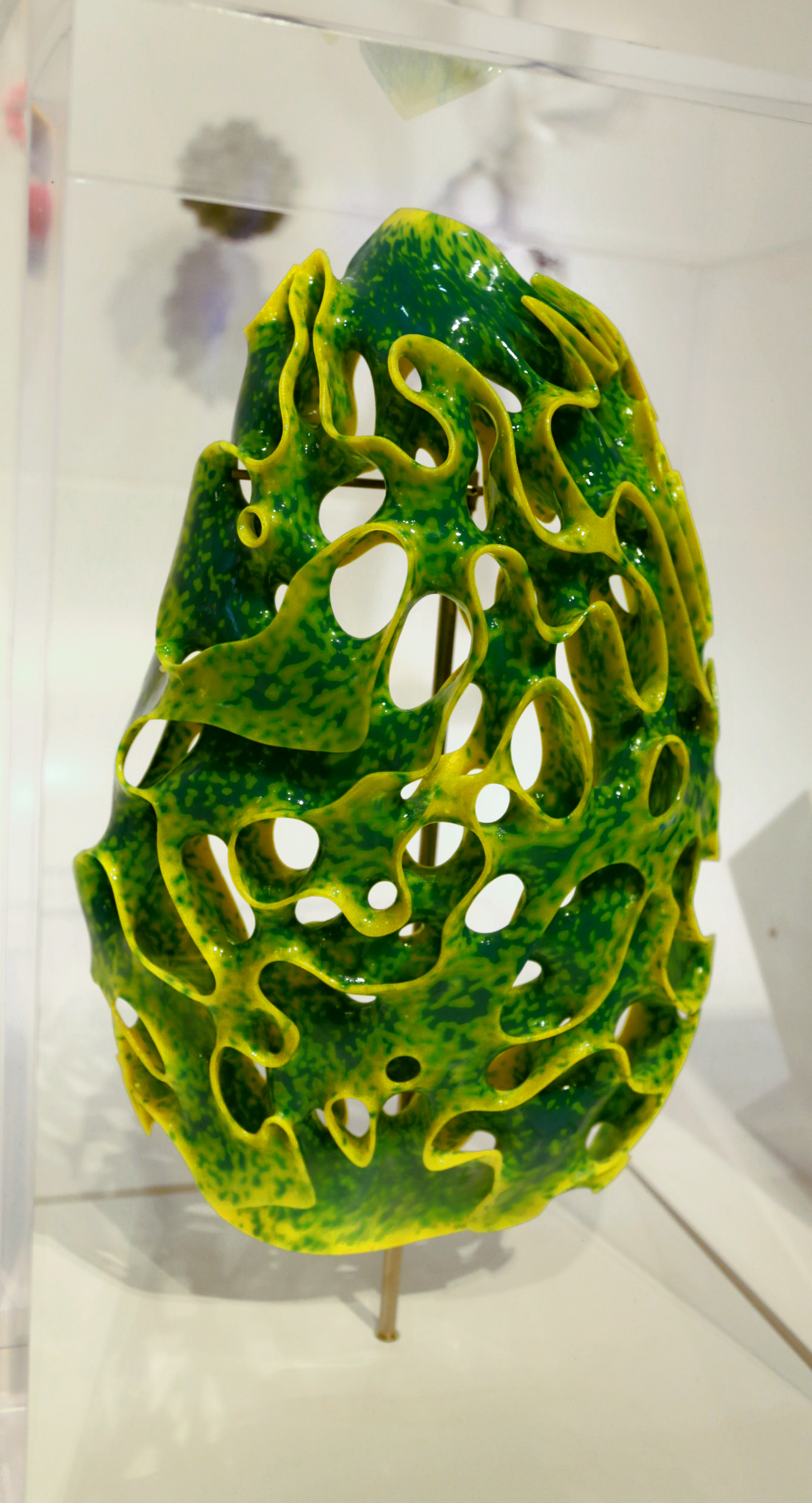
Pneuma 2

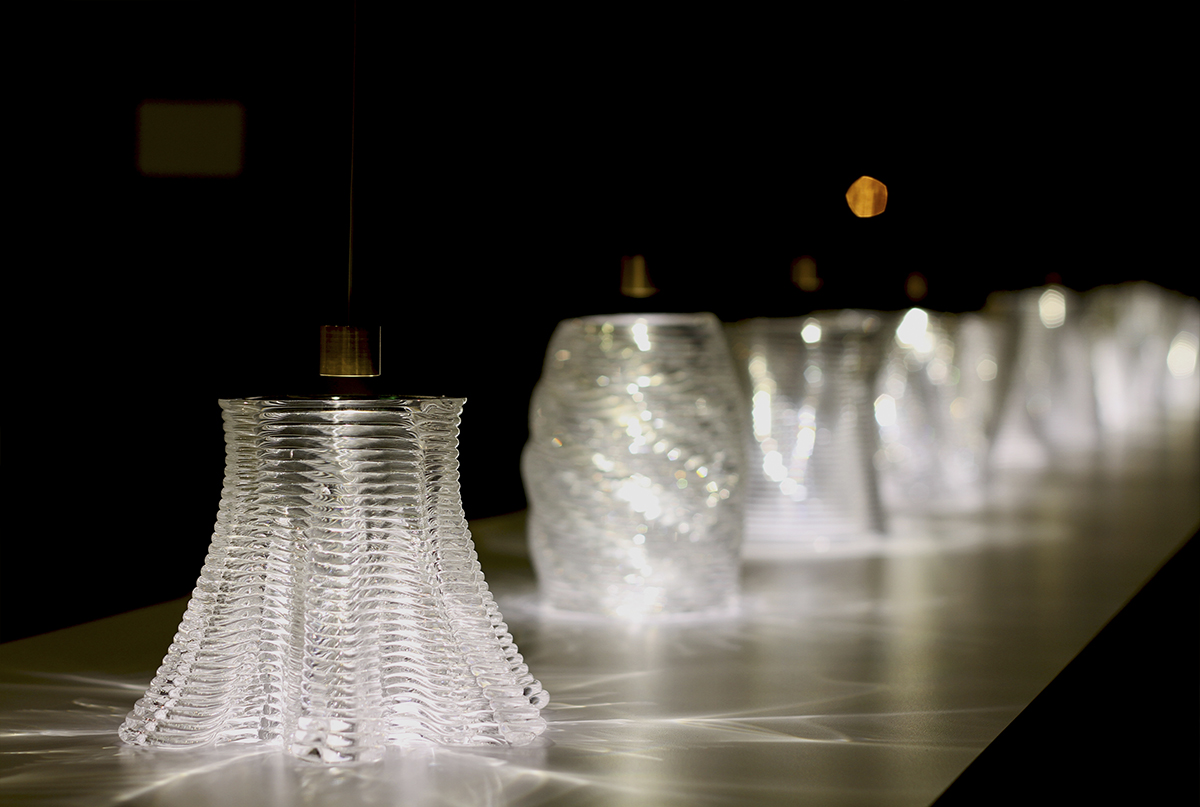
G3DP printed glasswork

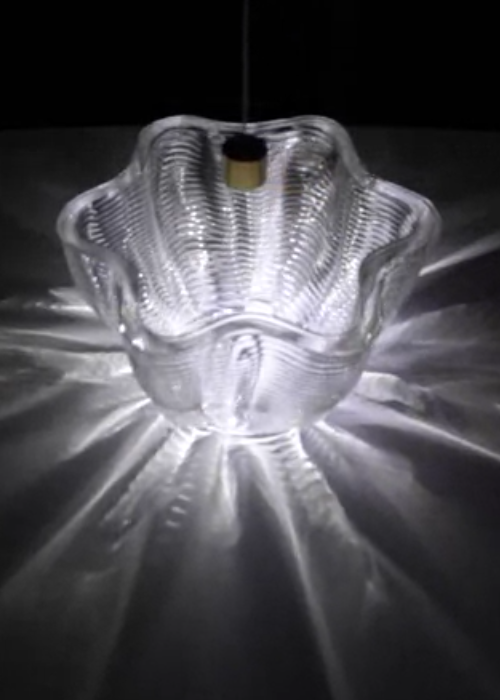
G3DP bowl

Processes and installations

G3DP printing process

Silk Pavilion process

Synthetic Apiary studies

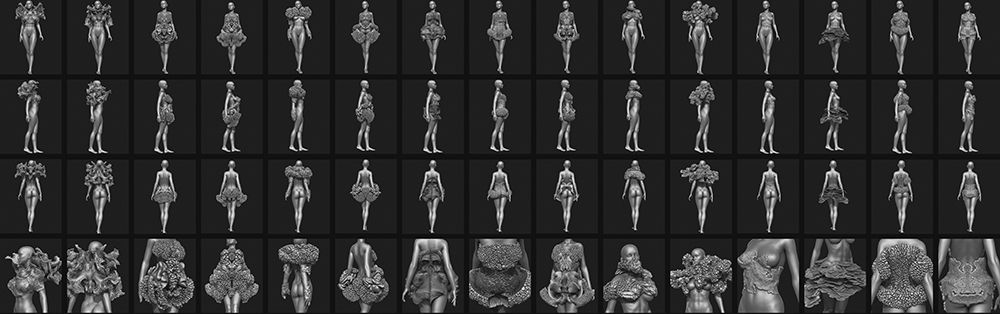
Morphologies used for Wanderers

3DP microfluidic valve design

=== Selected exhibits ===
- SFMOMA, San Francisco: 2022 (Nature × Humanity)
- MoMA, New York: 2007, 2010 (Action: Design over Time), 2015 (This Is for Everyone), 2020 (Neri Oxman: Material Ecology)
- Cooper Hewitt Museum: 2015 (Making Design), 2016 (Beauty)
- Centre Pompidou, Paris: 2012 (Imaginary Beings exhibit, Multiversités Créatives)
- Science Museum, London: 2012 & 2013 (3D PRINT SHOW)
- Museum of Science, Boston: 2012 (Neri Oxman: At the Frontier of Ecological Design)
- Museum of Fine Arts, Boston: 2013, 2016 (#techstyle: Production)
- Museum of Applied Arts, Vienna: 2014 (150 Years of the MAK)
- National Gallery of Victoria, Victoria: 2017 (NGV Triennial)
- Beijing Art Biennale: 2006–2010

== Publications ==
- 2020: Hybrid Living Materials
- 2016: Recursive symmetries for complex additive manufacturing
- 2015: Additive Manufacturing of Optically Transparent Glass
- 2015: Flow-based fabrication
- 2013: Compound Fabrication
- 2011: Variable property rapid prototyping
- 2010: Material-based Design Computation, PhD-thesis, Massachusetts Institute of Technology

== Awards and recognition ==
Oxman is a senior fellow in the Design Futures Council, and a Royal Designer for Industry in the UK. She has won the Vilcek Prize in Design, a National Design Award, and a SFMOMA Contemporary Vision Award.

In 2016, she served as a culture leader at the World Economic Forum and received MIT's Collier Medal. In 2018, she received a Design Innovation Medal from the London Design Festival. The following year, Aguahoja was named "Sustainable Design of the Year" and "Design Project of the Year" in Dezeen's annual awards.
