= CAADRIA =

The Association for Computer-Aided Architectural Design Research in Asia (CAADRIA) (founded in 1996) provides a platform for CAAD-related academics and professionals to share experiences, best practices, and results in education and research in Asia and beyond.

== Objectives ==
The association has been created with several objectives. It aims to facilitate dissemination of information about CAAD amongst Asian Schools of Architecture, Planning, Engineering, & Building Sciences in Asia, and encourage the exchange of software, courseware, experiences and staff/students amongst schools. It conducts several activities to identify research and development needs specific to CAAD education and initiate collaboration to satisfy them, and promote research and teaching in CAAD which enhances creativity rather than simply production technologies.

== Organisation ==
=== Membership ===
Membership to the association is open to individuals (teachers, researchers, students, and architects) and institutions (universities, libraries), either as active member (someone who attends the conference) or as sponsor member. Typically, one becomes an individual member through attending and registering at a CAADRIA conference, or by applying for membership to the secretariat. Institutions in Asia, Australia and New Zealand can apply for institutional membership and gain access to CumInCAD database.

Membership lasts for one year, and gives access to digital proceedings of CAADRIA, email announcements of forthcoming events of interest and one vote at the Annual General Meeting of CAADRIA.

=== Executive committee ===
CAADRIA is governed by an administrative council elected by the membership. Responsibility for organisation, administration and guidance of the association is delegated to the executive committee by virtue of the election of the officers. Membership of the council is restricted to members working in countries within the Asia Pacific region; term of office is two years. There is an annual general meeting (normally convened during the annual conference) at which the business of the association is agreed by the membership. This forum is considered the highest level of authority and shall be the only one with the power to amend the charter of CAADRIA.

=== Secretariat ===
The Secretariat is composed of volunteer staff, with a limited budget being made available through membership dues and supervised by the executive committee.

==== List of presidents ====
Period	Name	Institution
2020–2024	Anastasia Globa	University of Sydney, Australia
2018–2020	Christiane M Herr	Xi'an Jiaotong-Liverpool University, China
2016–2018	Hyunsoo Lee	Yonsei University, Republic of Korea
2014–2016	Teng-Wen Chang	National Yunlin University of Science and Technology, Taiwan
2012–2014	Tomohiro Fukuda	Osaka University, Japan
2010–2012	Andrew I-Kang Li	The Chinese University of Hong Kong
2008–2010	Marc Aurel Schnabel	University of Sydney, Australia
2004–2008	Bharat Dave	University of Melbourne, Australia
2002–2004	Aleppo Yu-Tung Liu	National Chiao-Tung University, Taiwan
1998–2002	Jin-Yeu Tsou	The Chinese University of Hong Kong
1996–1998	Thomas Kvan	University of Hong Kong

== Activities ==
=== List of conferences ===
The annual conference is the main event organised under the auspices of the association. It is organised by a member in good standing, who volunteers for the organisation. The organiser is supported by members of the administrative council, in particular the conference liaison. Over the years, the association has developed the policy to circulate the conference location in such a way that southern, eastern, western, and northern parts of Europe are reached regularly – although this principle can only be maintained on the basis of available organisers. In the past years, the following CAADRIA conferences have been organised:

Year	Place	Institution	Proceedings
2024	Singapore	Architecture and Sustainable Design, Singapore University of Technology and Design	
2023	Ahmedabad, India	Faculty of Architecture, CEPT University	Volume 1 ISBN 978-988-78917-9-6 Volumn 2 ISBN 978-988-78918-0-2
2022	Sydney, Australia	University of New South Wales, University of Sydney, and University of Technology Sydney	Volume 1 ISBN 978-988-78917-7-2 Volumn 2 ISBN 978-988-78917-8-9
2021	Hong Kong, SAR	School of Architecture, The Chinese University of Hong Kong	Volumn 1 ISBN 978-988-78917-5-8 Volume 2 ISBN 978-988-78917-6-5
2020	Bangkok, Thailand	Faculty of Architecture, Chulalongkorn University	
2019	Wellington, New Zealand	Faculty of Architecture & Design, Victoria University of Wellington	
2018	Beijing, China	School of Architecture, Tsinghua University & DADA	ISBN 978-988-19026-0-3
2017	Suzhou, China	Xi’An Jiantong-Liverpool University	ISBN 978-988-19026-8-9
2016	Melbourne, Australia	The University of Melbourne	
2015	Daegu, Korea	Kyungpook National University	ISBN 978-988-19026-6-5
2014	Kyoto, Japan	Department of Design, Engineering & Management, Kyoto Institute of Technology	
2013	Singapore	School of Design and Environment, National University of Singapore	ISBN 978-988-19026-4-1
2012	Chennai, India	School of Architecture, Hindustan University	ISBN 978-988-19026-3-4
2011	Newcastle, Australia	School of Architecture and Built Environment, The University of Newcastle	ISBN 978-988-19026-2-7
2010	Hong Kong, SAR	The School of Architecture & Institute of Space & Earth Information Science at the Chinese University of Hong Kong	ISBN 978-988190261-0
2009	Yunlin, Taiwan	Department of Digital Media Design and Graduate School of Computational Design, National Yunlin University of Science and Technology	ISBN 978-986-01-8080-0
2008	Chiang Mai, Thailand	Faculty of Architecture; Chiang Mai University	
2007	Nanjing, China	Southeast University and Nanjing University	ISBN 978-7-5641-0925-7
2006	Kumamoto, Japan	School of Architecture and Civil Engineering; Kumamoto University	ISBN 4-907662-01-7
2005	New Delhi, India	TVB School of Habitat Studies; Indraprastha University	ISBN 81-902816-0-7 (set)
2004	Seoul, Korea	Institute of Millennium Environmental Design and Research; Yonsei University and The Korean Housing Association	ISBN 89-7141-648-3
2003	Bangkok, Thailand	Rangsit University	ISBN 974-9584-13-9
2002	Cyberjaya, Malaysia	Faculty of Creative Multimedia; Multimedia University Malaysia	ISBN 983-2473-42-X
2001	Sydney, Australia	Key Centre of Design Computing and Cognition, Faculty of Architecture; University of Sydney	ISBN 1-86487-096-6
2000	Singapore	Centre for Advanced Studies in Architecture (CASA), School of Architecture, Faculty of Architecture, Building and Real Estate; National University of Singapore	ISBN 981-04-2491-4
1999	Shanghai, China	College of Architecture and Urban Planning; Tonji University	ISBN 7-5439-1233-3
1998	Osaka, Japan	Sasada Laboratory, Department of Environmental Engineering; Osaka University	ISBN 4-907662-00-9
1997	Hsintsu, Taiwan	Architecture Group, Graduate School of Applied Arts; National Chiao-Tung University	ISBN 957-575-057-8
1996	Hong Kong	HKU Department of Architecture; The University of Hong Kong	ISBN 962-7757-03-9

=== Publications ===
==== Proceedings ====
Each year the conference papers are gathered into a proceedings publication which is distributed to members, and available to the public via the organization's web site.

==== CumInCAD ====
CumInCAD is a cumulative index of publications about computer-aided architectural design. Full texts, in PDF, of CAADRIA proceedings are available through this archive. Public CumInCAD records are available via an Open Archives Initiative Protocol for Metadata Harvesting (OAI-PMH) feed and records are available via multiple bibliographic archives and citation indexes online.

==== International Journal of Architectural Computing ====
The International Journal of Architectural Computing (IJAC) is an international, peer-reviewed academic journal in the area of CAAD. This journal was established as an international collaboration between the sister organisations and continues to be supported by those sister organisations, representatives of which are members of the editorial board. It is produced quarterly, both in print and online, and a special rate of subscription is available to all members of CAADRIA.

=== Awards and fellowships ===
==== CAADRIA fellows ====
- Tomohiro Fukuda, Osaka University
- John Gero, University of Sydney
- Thomas Kvan, The University of Melbourne
- Marc Aurel Schnabel, Victoria University of Wellington

==== Tee Sasada Award ====
The Sasada Award is instituted in the memory of Professor Tsuyoshi Sasada (1941–2005), emeritus Professor at Osaka University, as well as co-founder and Fellow of CAADRIA. This award is given to an individual whose sustained record of contributions demonstrates or promises significant impact on the field of computer-aided design. In keeping with Tee's spirit, the award recipient should have contributed to the next generation of researchers and academics, to the wider profession and practice in computer-aided design and research, and earned recognition in the peer community. The Sasada Award is announced and presented at the annual CAADRIA conference. The Award supports the winner to undertake an academic visit at the Osaka Lab and covers return airfare, accommodation and meals for one week. The Award recipient is expected to contribute to the academic and research activities at the Osaka Lab in the form of seminars and interaction with research students and staff.

==== Best Paper Award ====
The Best Paper Award Committee is organized at the conference site by the Exco member in charge of awards. The Site Coordinator identifies two local members who are appropriately qualified to join this committee. All papers printed in proceedings and presented at the conference are eligible for this award. The paper is awarded on the basis of the clarity of writing, good structure and argument, contribution to the field, a good conclusion, contribution and relevance to CAADRIA, use of appropriate illustrations and tables, and appropriate references.

==== Best Presentation Award ====
The Best Presentation Award Committee is organized at the conference site by the Exco member in charge of awards. The Site Coordinator identifies two local members who are appropriately qualified to join this committee. Only presentations made by one of the authors are eligible for this award. The presentations are awarded on the basis of: good use of time, how well-paced they are, good use of appropriate media, delivery, contribution and relevance to CAADRIA, and how well questions have been handled.

==== Young CAADRIA Award ====
Young CAADRIA Award is funded by CAADRIA and consists of a waiver of the conference delegation fees if the abstract is selected for a paper presentation. It is awarded on the basis of the CV provided.

== Related organisations ==
=== Sister organisations ===
CAADRIA is one of five sister organisations in CAAD worldwide that share the same mission: ACADIA (North America, founded 1981), SIGraDi (Ibero-America, founded 1997), eCAADe (Europe, founded 1983), and ASCAAD (Arabic countries of west Asia, and North Africa, founded 2001).

=== Other organisations and resources ===
A strongly related organisation in the area of CAAD is the CAAD Futures Foundation (global scope, founded 1985).

== See also ==
- Comparison of CAD software
- CAADRIA 2015
