= Digital architecture =

Architecture using digital technology

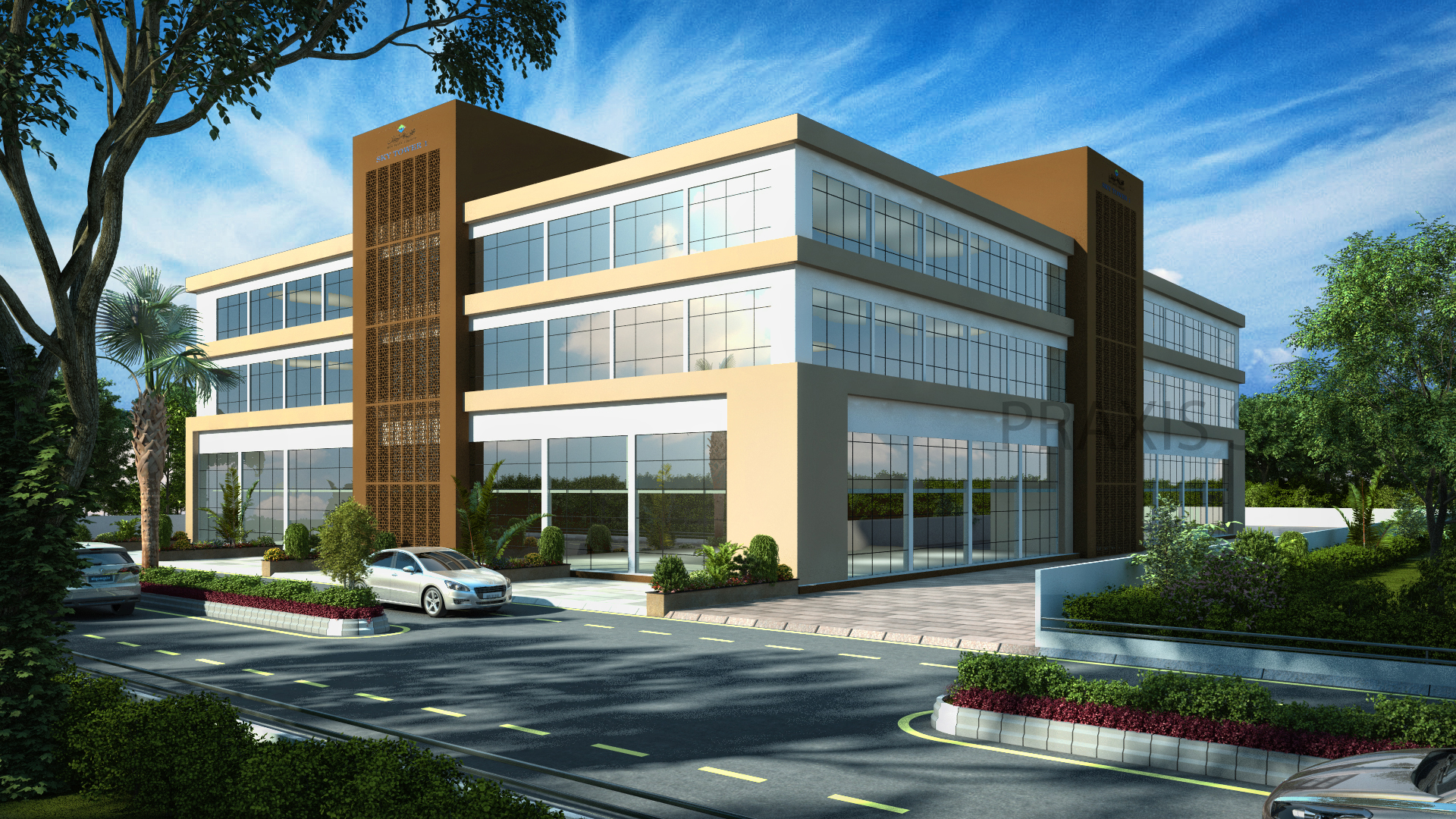
A digital model of a building created using architecture software

Digital architecture refers to aspects of architecture that feature digital technologies or considers digital platforms as online spaces. The emerging field of digital architectures therefore applies to both classic architecture as well as the emerging study of social media technologies.

Within classic architectural studies, the terminology is used to apply to digital skins that can be streamed images and have their appearance altered. A headquarters building design for Boston television and radio station WGBH by Polshek Partnership has been discussed as an example of digital architecture and includes a digital skin.

Within social media research, digital architecture refers to the technical protocols that enable, constrain, and shape user behavior in a virtual space. Features of social media platforms such as how they facilitate user connections, enable functionality, and generate data are considered key properties that distinguish one digital architecture from another.

== Overview ==
Architecture created digitally might not involve the use of actual materials (brick, stone, glass, steel, wood). It relies on "sets of numbers stored in electromagnetic format" used to create representations and simulations that correspond to material performance and to map out built artifacts. It thus can involve digital twinning for planned construction or for maintenance management. Digital architecture does not just represent "ideated space"; it also creates places for human interaction that do not resemble physical architectural spaces. Examples of these places in the "Internet Universe" and cyberspace include websites, multi-user dungeons, MOOs, and web chatrooms.

Digital architecture allows complex calculations that delimit architects and allow a diverse range of complex forms to be created with great ease using computer algorithms. The new genre of "scripted, iterative, and indexical architecture" produces a proliferation of formal outcomes, leaving the designer the role of selection and increasing the possibilities in architectural design. This has "re-initiated a debate regarding curvilinearity, expressionism and role of technology in society" leading to new forms of non-standard architecture by architects such as Zaha Hadid, Kas Oosterhuis and UN Studio. A conference held in London in 2009 named "Digital Architecture London" introduced the latest development in digital design practice.

The Far Eastern International Digital Design Award (The Feidad Award) has been in existence since 2000 and honours "innovative design created with the aid of digital media." In 2005 a jury with members including a representative from Quantum Film, Greg Lynn from Greg Lynn FORM, Jacob van Rijs of MVRDV, Gerhard Schmitt, Birger Sevaldson (Ocean North), chose among submissions "exploring digital concepts such as computing, information, electronic media, hyper-, virtual-, and cyberspace in order to help define and discuss future space and architecture in the digital age."

== Social media ==
The concept of digital architectures has a long history in Internet scholarship. Prior to social media, scholars focused on how the structure of an online space – such as a forum, website, or blog – shaped the formation of publics and political discourses. With the rapid rise of social media, scholars have turned their attention to how the architectural design of social media platforms affects the behavior of influential users, such as political campaigns. This line of research differs from the affordances approach, which focuses on the relationships between users and technology, rather than the digital architecture of the platform.

== See also ==
- Architectural theory – Act of thinking, discussing, and writing about architecture
- Affordance – Possibility of an action on an object or environment
- Building information modeling – Process for digital management of built assets
  - List of BIM software
- Blobitecture – Organic architectural style
- Design computing – Computing as applied to design
- Digital art – Art created digitally with a computer
- Digital twin – Digital replica of a living or non-living physical entity
- Computer cartography – Compiling data to create a visual image
- Digital morphogenesis – Type of generative art
- Information Age – Industrial shift to information technology
- Interactive architecture
- Social media – Virtual online communities
- Virtual reality – Computer-simulated experience
