= Stahl House =

Historic house in Los Angeles, California

- Stahl House; Case Study House No. 22
- U.S. National Register of Historic Places
- Los Angeles Historic-Cultural Monument
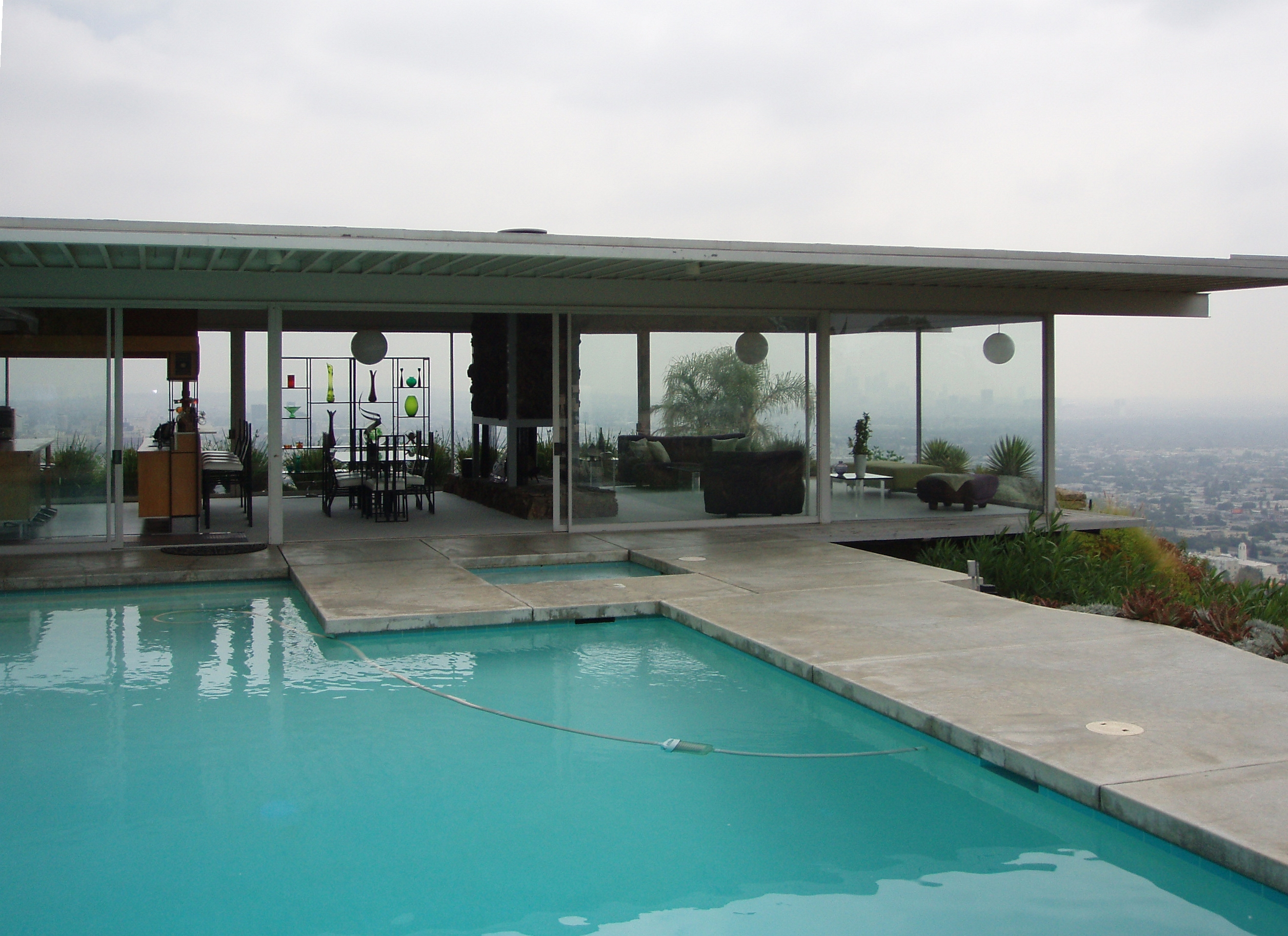
- The Stahl House in 2005

- Location within the Los Angeles metropolitan area Location within California Location within the United States
- Location: 1635 Woods Drive; Los Angeles, California, US
- Coordinates: 34.100437°N 118.370152°W
- Built: 1960
- Architect: Pierre Koenig
- Architectural style: International
- NRHP reference No.: 13000519
- LAHCM No.: 670

Significant dates
- Added to NRHP: July 24, 2013
- Designated LAHCM: November 9, 1999

The Stahl House (a.k.a. Case Study House No. 22) is a mid-century modern house in the Hollywood Hills section of Los Angeles, California, United States. Built as part of the Case Study Houses program, the house was completed in 1960 and designed by architect Pierre Koenig for the family of Buck Stahl. It is a frequent filming and photography location in films, TV shows, advertisements, and fashion shoots. The building is listed on the National Register of Historic Places and is a Los Angeles Historic-Cultural Monument.

The house is an L-shaped structure, which is cantilevered over a cliff that drops sharply at one end. The house has a solid wall facing the street, while all the other walls are made of glass, overlooking the city below. The two wings of the L surround a swimming pool. The interior spans about 2,200–2,300 square feet (200–210 m^{2}) and has a steel frame, which is left exposed throughout the house. One wing of the L has the living room, dining room, and kitchen, and the other wing contains the house's two bedrooms; there are also two bathrooms. To preserve views throughout the house, there are few solid walls, and electric wiring and heating ducts are embedded into the floor.

The Stahl House was built as part of the second phase of Case Study houses, constructed after 1950 and generally built out of steel. The clients, Buck and Carlotta Stahl, bought the site in May 1954 soon after getting married. After two years of grading the land, they consulted several architects until Koenig agreed to design the house in late 1957. Koenig modified the initial plans, which Buck had drawn up, and the house was erected between May 1959 and May 1960. The house was popularized by one image taken by Julius Shulman upon its completion, and it was frequently used for media shoots starting in 1962. The Stahl family lived there until 2007, when they opened the house for tours. In 2025, the house was placed on sale for the first time.

== Site ==
The Stahl House is located at 1635 Woods Drive (Note: Jackson 2007, p. 43, erroneously gives the address as 1636 Woods Drive.) in the Hollywood Hills neighborhood of Los Angeles, California, United States. The land lot spans about 86 by 150 feet (26 by 46 m). Located nearby are the Storer House to the east and Chateau Marmont to the south. It was built as part of the Case Study Houses program and is one of about two dozen such residences to be built. At the time of the building's construction, Case Study Houses were generally built in the Hollywood Hills and Pacific Palisades neighborhoods of Los Angeles and the adjacent cities of Beverly Hills and Pasadena.

Due to the hilly topography of the site, the land slopes down sharply to the south and west, and there is a cliff on the eastern side of the lot. The house is cantilevered over the cliff; the drop off to the bottom of the cliff is about 125 feet (38 m). Pierre Koenig, the house's architect, was the only person who had been willing to build on the cliff. Due to the house's elevated topography, a 100-square-mile (260 km^{2}) portion of Los Angeles County is visible from the house, encompassing locations as disparate as Downtown Los Angeles, Santa Monica Bay, and Santa Catalina Island. A series of narrow terraced gardens surrounds the site on the south and west slopes.

== Architecture ==
Koenig designed the house in the mid-century modern style. The design was influenced by its topography and lot size—a tenet of organic architecture—in contrast to other mid-century modernist structures, whose designs did not relate to the landscape, For instance, the house was placed on axis with the street grid at the bottom of the hill. Arts & Architecture magazine, which sponsored the Case Study Houses program, said the design had been intended "as shelter only", centered around the views from the interior. The house was built only using commercially available parts, and fewer than sixty unique types of building components. Koenig said of the design: "You can make anything beautiful given an unlimited amount of money, But to do it within the limits of economy is different."

=== Exterior ===
The house is an L-shaped structure cantilevered either 8 feet (2.4 m) or 10 feet (3.0 m). The house has a solid wall facing the street, with a main entrance through a carport; this is the only solid wall on the facade. The carport has the inscription "CHS", in reference to the full name of the original owner, Clarence Henry "Buck" Stahl. The street-facing wall, covered with vertical boards of roof decking, terminates the longer western leg of the L. The only other interruptions to the facade are door frames and steel columns. The rest of the facade uses floor-to-ceiling plate glass walls, covering about 70% of the facade area. The glass panels were the largest on the market at the time and were intended to permit a 240-degree or 270-degree view of the city from inside. When the house was built, Koenig said: "All my statements are not inward ... I look outward and the people inside are projected outward to whatever is around them." An external catwalk to facilitate cleaning and maintenance was added later on.

The house is topped by a flat roof, which measures 5 inches (130 mm) thick and is made of 18-gauge sheet metal. The roof is made of interlocking tongue and groove panels. It cantilevers outward about 7–8 feet (2.1–2.4 m) from the facade, forming a semi-sheltered carport on one side. The eaves of the cantilevered roof were designed with solar gain in mind, deflecting sunlight when the sun is higher in the sky. The eaves run without interruption around the house, and, combined with the house's positioning above a cliff, gave the massing the appearance of an eagle in flight. Due to the protruding eaves, the roof deck covers about 4,000 square feet (370 m^{2}), nearly twice the interior area.

There is a swimming pool outside the house, which was built after the rest of the house was already designed. It measures about 20 by 26 feet (6.1 by 7.9 m) across and ranges from 2 to 9 feet (0.61 to 2.74 m) deep. Both wings of the house are arranged around the swimming pool. The pool has two inlets extending toward the house's facade, interrupting the direct path from the house's carport. Concrete slabs span these inlets, providing access to the entrance. The pool's site originally intended to be used as a yard, but the pool was added because it was a prerequisite for a loan that helped pay for the house's construction. A narrow walkway surrounds the pool, creating what the biographer Neil Jackson called "no great sense of stability or of enclosure". The rest of the land was devoted to yards for utilities, the children, and the parents. Koenig treated the pool as a primary element of the house's architecture, a design choice he would repeat with the Oberman House in Palos Verdes Estates, California, in 1962.

=== Interior ===
==== Structural and mechanical features ====
The house has a steel frame, which is left exposed inside the house. The columns are spaced 20 feet (6.1 m) apart, twice as far as Koenig's earlier Bailey House, and divide the interior spaces into 20-foot-square modules. Koenig used 4-inch (100 mm) columns (Note: Erroneously described by the National Park Service as 40-inch columns. However, the 4-inch figure is cited independently by several sources.) with H-shaped cross-sections, as well as 12-inch-thick (300 mm) I-beams to support the protruding eaves. To simplify construction, the steel structural members were cut to two sizes. The entire frame was welded together.

Beneath the house is a grid of intersecting transverse and longitudinal steel beams. The cantilevered section of the floor is supported by reinforced concrete beams measuring 30 inches (760 mm) deep. The foundations under the rest of the house were supposed to contain caissons, offset from the columns above to avoid exacerbating erosion of the site. However, the writer Kim Cross states that the caissons were likely installed. Both the Stahls and Koenig described the house as using "counterweights", and Jackson told Cross that the foundation drawings depicted concrete blocks, which plausibly could have functioned as counterweights.

The floors are made of concrete with an embedded radiant heating system. The floor slab was poured after the copper pipes for the radiant heating system, along with electric wiring, had been laid; there were no other places to put the ducts and wiring, as the house lacked a cellar or attic. This required jackhammering into the floor slab whenever a duct or wire had to be replaced. As built, the structure lacked any air conditioning system or even HVAC ductwork, and the facade had sliding glass doors to allow ventilation via cross-breezes.

==== Rooms ====
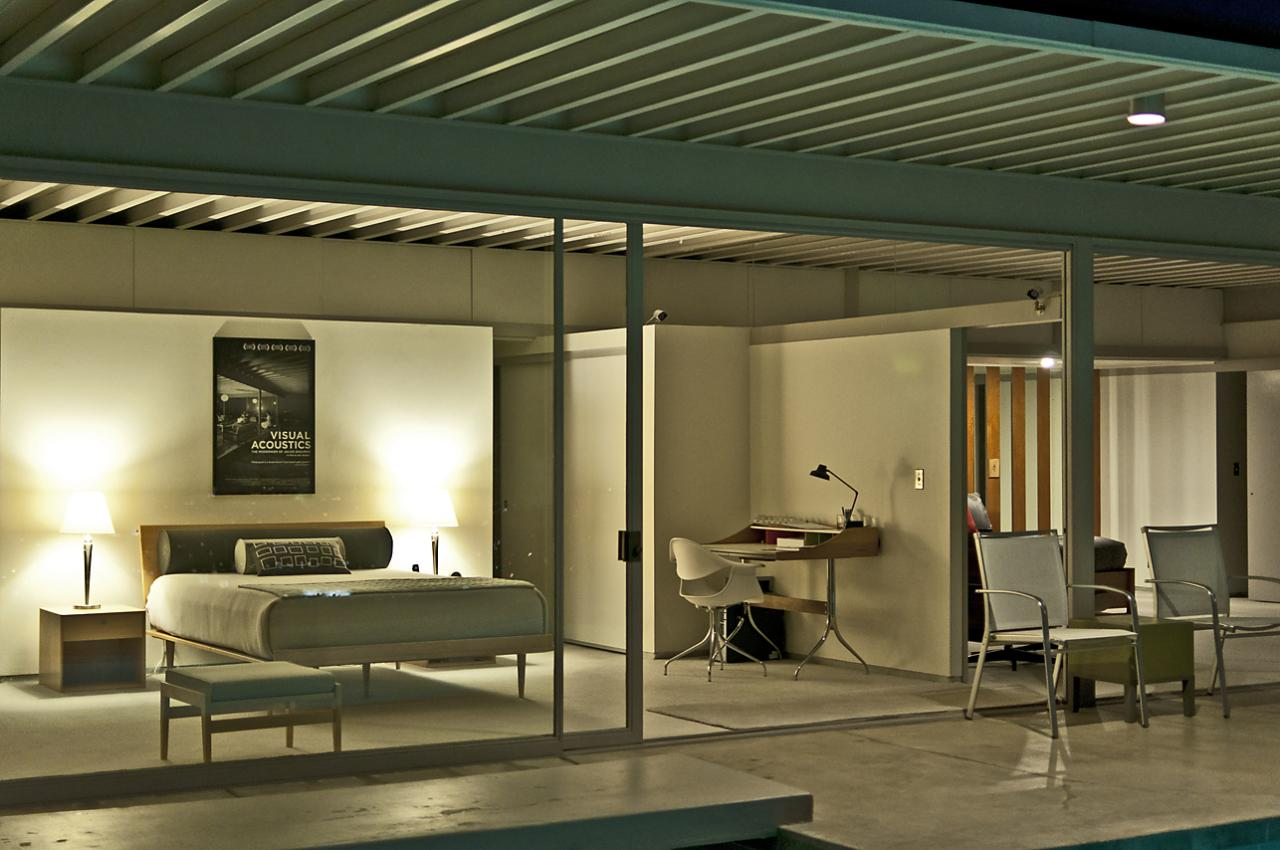
The bedrooms were placed within one wing of the L.

The interior covers 2,200 square feet (200 m^{2}) or 2,300 square feet (210 m^{2}). The rooms are arranged according to function. The southern wing of the L is for social functions (namely the living room, dining room, and kitchen), and the western wing contains the house's two bedrooms. A service area with the master bathroom, dressing room, and service yard adjoins the outer corner of the L. Aside from the service area, every room faces the swimming pool. To allow occupants to enjoy views of the city from throughout the interior, Koenig used minimal ornamentation. Koenig incorporated solid walls only between the bedrooms and around the mechanical area; these walls are finished with gypsum board.

The master bedroom connects the children's bedrooms with the rest of the house; there were no hallways, as Buck had considered them to be wasteful utilization of space. The children's bedroom, near the carport at the house's western end, could alternately be accessed from the pool and was originally divided into two sleeping areas. The house is sometimes described as having two bathrooms, though an Arts & Architecture article from 1960 counts three bathrooms. The first one is the master bathroom, which has a sunken shower, makeup table, private toilet, and double sink. The dressing room, separating the master bedroom and master bathroom, has a double wardrobe. The other bathrooms are within the children's bedroom, as well as a guest bathroom near the entrance. Both the master bathroom and the children's bathroom have mosaic tile showers with light blue floors and blue-or-gray walls.

A plastic illuminated ceiling hangs from the roof slab above the kitchen, and three spherical lamps are hung from the ceiling, with wiring passing through the roof. The original kitchen appliances, manufactured by General Electric, were painted pink. The kitchen counters are also freestanding, and there are aluminum-and-wood kitchen cabinets and a double sink. The living room fireplace, built as a freestanding structure, was prefabricated offsite and then installed inside the house; it incorporates gypsum boards along with steel angles. A 2013 report by the National Park Service found that most of the decorations remained intact, aside from the kitchen.

== History ==
=== Background ===
==== Architectural context ====
The house was built as part of the Case Study Houses program, announced by publisher John Entenza in the January 1945 issue of Arts & Architecture magazine. The program, which ran until 1966, sought to develop inexpensive and efficient model homes to meet housing demand in the postwar United States. The first 13 Case Study houses were developed together in the 1940s, while the other houses were developed incrementally. These houses were built on private lots across Southern California, rather than at expositions or government-owned land as other demonstration houses had been, and were given a strict budget. The early Case Study houses tended to use wood, brick, concrete, and glass. Because the houses did not receive government subsidies, materials were either donated or, more commonly, bought at market value.

The second phase of Case Study houses built after 1950 tended to use more steel, following the loosening of US governmental restrictions on that material. Prior to the Stahl House's completion, the Eames House (No. 8), Entenza House (No. 9), and Case Study House No. 16 had all incorporated steel into their construction. The Stahl House's architect, Pierre Koenig, was an architecture student in 1950 when he designed the L-shaped Koenig House No. 1. Koenig was, at the time, working under Raphael Soriano, who was designing another Case Study House. When Entenza learned about Koenig House No. 1, he had Julius Shulman photograph Koenig's work. Entenza also offered Koenig the chance to design one of the Case Study houses if Koenig were able to find a client. In 1956, just before designing the Stahl House, Koenig worked on another steel-framed Case Study House, the Bailey House (No. 21); although the Bailey and Stahl houses ended up using similar materials, they were commissioned for different types of clients.

==== Client and site ====
The house's namesake was Clarence Henry "Buck" Stahl (1912–2005), (Note: Multiple sources: For Buck's birth, see Gronwald, Stahl & Cross 2021, p. 8.; For Buck's death, see Thornburg 2009.) an artist and football player who variously worked as a sign painter, graphic designer, United States Navy instructor, and purchasing agent for Hughes Aircraft. While working at Hughes Aircraft's Los Angeles office, Buck met Carlotta May Gates, a 24-year-old receptionist at North American Aviation. Sources disagree on whether they met on a work trip or whether they were introduced by a mutual friend. Buck and Carlotta married in March 1954 after dating less than a year. Initially, they rented a house on the Hollywood Hills of Los Angeles. The couple was interested in a nearby hilltop site owned by George Beha, which had gained a local reputation as a surreptitious romantic rendezvous.

The Stahls drove up the hill two months after their wedding and, upon seeing Beha there, asked him if the site was for sale. Initially, Beha offered to sell two adjoining parcels for $25,000, (Note: Equivalent to $237,000 in 2025) but the Stahls could barely afford even one parcel, and then only with a mortgage loan. Ultimately, the Stahls agreed to buy the smaller, 5,500-square-foot (510 m^{2}) lot. The total sale price was $13,500, (Note: Equivalent to $128,000 in 2025) and the Stahls provided a down payment of $100. (Note: Equivalent to $900 in 2025) The site was initially subject to a racial restrictive covenant prohibiting any nonwhite persons (other than servants) from inhabiting the site. Work could not begin until the site had been fully paid off, which could have taken several years, considering the minimum monthly installments of $200. (Note: Equivalent to $1,900 in 2025) The Stahls' friends regarded the purchase as outlandish, given that the site alone had cost about as much as a newly-built Southern California residence.

At the time of the Stahls' acquisition, the surrounding sites were being cleared and leveled for development, and the developer Richard Larkin had obtained many of these plots. For two years. Buck and Carlotta drove around Los Angeles, asking building contractors for permission to use their discarded reclaimed concrete rubble to flatten the lot. Buck, who did not have enough money to rent equipment to mechanically flatten the site, did the work entirely manually. Larkin advised Buck how to fill the gaps in the rubble. On Larkin's advice, Buck pushed the debris down the hillside into a gully, where the city government—which was looking for rubble to use in the Los Angeles International Airport—hauled it away free of charge. This process took two years and expanded the lot's buildable area by 6 feet (1.8 m) on each side.

=== Development ===
==== Design ====
The inclusion of the swimming pool (pictured) was a precondition for funding the house.

Buck Stahl provided the inspiration for the overall structure, setting out his ideal house in an architectural model. In August 1956, Buck created his first model out of used beverage cans and clay; unlike the final design, the model had a curved rear wall and a butterfly roof. Buck's model envisioned a minimalist, open plan house with glass walls, similar to other modernist buildings of the time. After grading the site, the Stahls began meeting with architects to design a home for the parcel, cold calling several of them, including Case Study architect Craig Ellwood. Upon observing the site, the architects all told him that the plan was infeasible. They variously dismissed his proposals for a glass wall or claimed that a house cantilevered above a cliff was not compliant with city building codes. Buck, undeterred, continued looking for an architect. Sources disagree on whether Buck eventually saw a picture of Pierre Koenig in the Los Angeles Examiner and contacted him, or whether Carlotta read about Koenig's use of industrial materials.

When Koenig visited the site, he concluded that, while the site was challenging, Buck's plan could be built using steel and cement. Buck told Koenig that he wanted a 270-degree panoramic view from the house, which Koenig offered to do. Before being officially hired, Koenig revised Buck's original design conception, removing a planned waterfall flowing down the hill. The waterfall had been deemed too expensive for the Stahls' budget, as was the butterfly roof, which Koenig replaced with a flat roof. Koenig straightened out the design and relocated a proposed carport that Buck had placed between two bedrooms. Koenig was not formally licensed to independently practice architecture in California until November 1957, when he offered the Stahls a contract, charging an architectural commission of 10% of the house's cost.

Koenig and the Stahls signed the contract the next month, December 4. By then, the Stahls had been displaced from their previous house to make way for the construction of Interstate 405. They received financial compensation from the city government, which was enough to pay off the site, as well as a temporary rental house. Since long-span steel beams had just become commercially available, Koenig revised the house's plans, spacing the columns twice as far apart as in the Bailey House. Koenig aligned the house's major axes with the street grid at the bottom of the hill, and he used minimal ornamentation so as to not detract from the landscape. Koenig submitted his designs to the city government in January 1958 after six months of work.

==== Funding and design changes ====
Koenig requested financing from several local banks, but the hillside lot and the flat roof deterred many potential lenders. Most banks rejected Koenig's applications outright, except for Broadway Federal Bank, an African-American community bank. Sources retrospectively described Broadway Federal's intervention as ironic, given that most of its other clients would not have been able to buy the Stahl site at all because of the racial restrictive covenant. Buck told Koenig, "I don't care what color their skin is, as long as their money is green." Approval of the loan may have been influenced by the fact that modernist architect Paul R. Williams sat on the bank's board. One account has it that Williams convinced bank officials to approve the loan.

The loan was ultimately approved in November 1958. In exchange for a $34,000 loan, (Note: Equivalent to $291,000 in 2025) Broadway Federal mandated changes to the design. These included the addition of a swimming pool, as well as an expanded carport that could fit two cars. The bank refused to finance the pool, forcing the Stahls to borrow another $3,455 (Note: Equivalent to $30,000 in 2025) or $3,800. (Note: Equivalent to $32,000 in 2025) Meanwhile, Koenig engrossed himself in several months of negotiations with the city, which was reluctant to approve the design because of the hilly site and the use of steel in a residential building. To convince city officials to approve the design, Koenig removed a proposed catwalk outside the house and reduced the cantilever's depth from 18 to 10 feet (5.5 to 3.0 m).

==== Construction ====
The city finally granted a permit for the house in January 1959. Carlotta retrospectively said that officials were hesitant because of the cantilever and that an official had said that there would "never be another house built like this 'cause they didn't like the big windows". Koenig also submitted the plans to the Case Study program, and Entenza approved Koenig's proposal that April; the Stahls' proposed house became Case Study House No. 22. Construction started that May, and in an article that month, Arts & Architecture declared that the house "proposes a fresh architectural solution towards the full utilization of the exciting possibilities of the site". Robert J. Brady was hired as the general contractor. William Porush, who had worked with Koenig on many of the architect's previous houses, was the structural engineer.

The foundation was to be completed first, followed by the steel frame and roof deck, the doors and walls, and then the utilities and the finishes. The use of mass-produced and modular building materials allowed work to be expedited. The septic tank was finished by May, the concrete foundation by June, and the steel frame in July. Five workers put up the building's steel frame in a single day, using a crane to install the beams. The roof followed during August and September. As the house neared completion in early 1960, the Stahls, with one young child and pregnant with another, struggled to afford the final funds. Carlotta had quit her job the previous year to care for their firstborn son Bruce, so they were living on Buck's $10,000 salary; to save $450 in construction costs, (Note: Equivalent to $4,000 in 2025) Buck offered to help with the finishes.

As with many of the other original Case Study House owners, the Stahls were given discounts on construction materials if they allowed a photographer—in the Stahls' case, Shulman—to take publicity images of the house. The house was supposed to be completed in time for an April 18 photoshoot with Julius Shulman, but work was so far behind schedule that Koenig was forced to delay the photoshoot by several weeks. Work was completed by May 1960, and Shulman staged his photoshoot on May 9. Shulman's photoshoot was fortuitous both for the house, which became widely known as a result of one specific image, and for Koenig's career. As built, the house was supposed to have upholstered steel furnishings, made by Van Keppel-Green. Despite the publicity that arose from the photoshoot, the Stahls were unable to afford the Van Keppel-Green furnishings, which were taken away after the shoot.

=== Stahl family use ===
The Stahl House was first inhabited on June 6, 1960, becoming the last house to be built as part of the Case Study program's second phase. The construction cost was variously cited as $35,000 (Note: Equivalent to $291,000 in 2025) or $37,500. (Note: Equivalent to $312,000 in 2025) Entenza mandated that Case Study House owners open their houses to the public for a few weeks when the houses were finished. A clause in Koenig's architectural contract allowed his team exclusive filming rights, and the right to visit the house up to once a week, for the house's first year. When the house was completed, one corner of the roof drained water off the cliff instead of into the sewer. Buck refused to pay Koenig his final $400 (Note: Equivalent to $3,000 in 2025) until this defect was fixed; this never happened, and Buck and Koenig did not speak for years.

The Stahls raised their children Bruce, Shari, and Mark there. The two eldest, Bruce and Shari, initially shared one of the bedrooms, with a short partition separating each sibling's side; they retrospectively wrote that, as children, they did not appreciate how famous the house was. The children frequently dived off the roof into the swimming pool, and Buck also added a fence to prevent his children from falling downhill. Over time, the house became commonly known as just the Stahl House. The Stahls sometimes found unsolicited guests in their swimming pool. Buck raised the wall near the carport, but this was only partly successful at deterring trespassers. Conversely, the Stahls did frequently invite people who asked them for visits; Shari later said that her parents invited anyone who had traveled that far up the hill. The family also hosted frequent barbecues and parties. Carlotta said in 2001 that she never hung pictures on the walls because the skyline views from inside were "perfect".

==== 1960s to 1980s ====
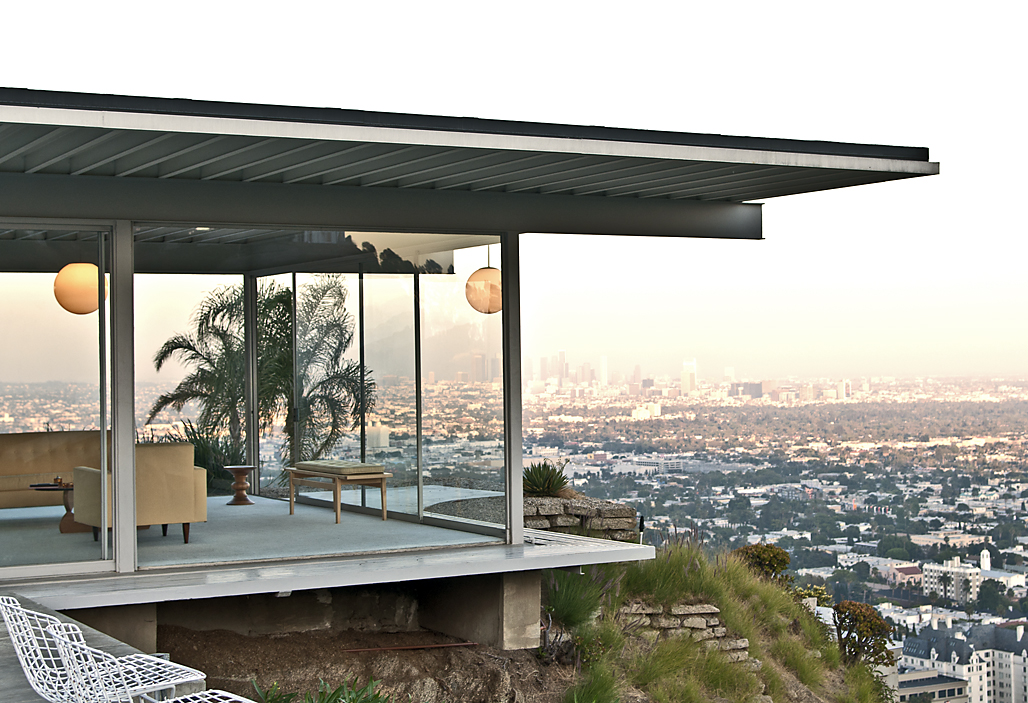
Exterior of the living room

The Stahls had relatively little money left over after their house was completed, prompting Buck and Carlotta to create their own clothes and play equipment. The house was used for film and photography shoots starting in 1962, and the family eventually paid off their loans with income from the film shoots and Buck's job in the aerospace industry. In August 1967, the family bought an adjacent lot at the bottom of the hill to preserve their views; Carlotta later said that "you never take the view for granted". When Mark was born in 1966, he initially slept in Carlotta's closet until 1968, when Buck and Carlotta subdivided the children's bedroom: one half for Shari, the other for Mark and Bruce. After Buck's employer ceased operations in mid-1969, the family moved about 1 mile (1.6 km) away, except for Buck, who worked in Tooele, Utah. The Stahl House was rented to other tenants for the next five years. The first occupant was the manager of the band War, and the second tenant repainted the interiors.

After moving back to Los Angeles, Buck saved up enough money to move back into the house in 1975, then remodeled the house back to its original design. The Stahl children adapted parts of the house for their own uses; for example, one of the service rooms became a darkroom after Shari joined a photography club. By 1977, both Bruce and Shari had moved out after graduating high school, and the children's bedroom became Mark's alone. Buck sold the lot at the bottom of the hill, but although the family received multiple offers over the years to purchase the house, they declined all the offers.

Despite a forest fire nearby in 1979 and earthquakes in 1971 and 1994, the house sustained no damage. Most of the deterioration arose through normal weather phenomena such as rain, which washed away Buck's terraces, and direct sunlight, which bleached the furnishings and burned Christmas trees. Due to deterioration of pipes embedded in the floor slab, the Stahls added a new plumbing system in the ceiling. The kitchen was refurbished in 1984, when the Stahls replaced the original Philippine mahogany with oak, and removed the original pink appliances. During the same decade, the family added a hot tub next to the pool, installed astroturf around the pool apron, and added a catwalk to make it easier to clean the windows.

==== 1990s and 2000s ====
Following a 1989 exhibition of the house's architecture at the Museum of Contemporary Art, Los Angeles, the family began inviting the Los Angeles Conservancy to host events there in 1990. During the next decade, the Stahls increasingly rented out their house for film shoots for additional income; Carlotta often stayed at the Chateau Marmont just down the hill whenever a shoot took place. The family also began inviting University of Southern California architecture students to the house in 1994 as part of a course taught by Victor A. Regnier; Koenig gave lectures every time USC students visited. By then, the Stahl children and Bruce's wife were increasingly involved with decisions regarding the home.

By the early 2000s, the house's valuation was estimated at $2.1 million, and the building was hosting events such as a cocktail party for the MAK Center for Art and Architecture, and a National Trust for Historic Preservation conference. Buck Stahl broke his hip in 2000 while giving a tour of the house, and he had to use a wheelchair for the rest of his life. Concurrently, the Stahl children took over maintenance after Carlotta began exhibiting signs of dementia. Carlotta still tried to clean the house whenever visitors came, and she estimated in 2004 that a thousand people visited every year. Buck Stahl died in 2005, at which point only Shari's family and Carlotta were living there. The last family members moved out in 2007, though the family retained ownership of the property.

=== Tourist attraction and sale listing ===
View from the dining room

After the Stahls moved out, the house was open for other events such as annual citywide tours of Los Angeles's modernist architecture, and it continued to host film shoots, though the Great Recession in 2008 depressed demand for shoots. As an alternate source of income, the Stahl children had begun giving tours by 2009. The building's minimalist, geometric architecture enticed many visitors, and within a few years, tickets for tours were selling out months in advance. Although Carlotta's memory continued to decline, to the extent that she eventually confused or forgot all three of her children, Shari recalled that her mother never forgot the house.

After Carlotta died in 2011, tours were given in small groups by a family member or family friend. Shari became the house's full-time manager and agent, coordinating the tours. A California company also created a mobile application to draw attention to the house's architecture. When Mark died in 2013, Shari and Bruce continued to own the house. During that decade, Jen Carlson of LAist wrote that the Stahl House had "become a property so coveted, even the tours sell out fast". The house attracted 7,000 annual visitors by the early 2020s. The city government approved another house at the bottom of the hillside in 2024, prompting concerns about the stability of the Stahl House's site. The Los Angeles Conservancy said the new house's approval endangered the Stahl House because the hillside was already vulnerable to rockfalls and landslides.

In November 2025, the Stahl House was listed for sale at $25 million, the first time in its history that it had been on the market. In a statement, the Stahl family said "it has become increasingly challenging to care for it with the attention and energy it so richly deserves", and indicated that they were looking for a "steward" who appreciated its cultural and architectural importance. The Stahls received hundreds of interested inquiries on the day the house's sale listing was published, and tours continued in the meantime. By late 2026, the house had still received no buyers, and the listing had been reduced to $20 million. The historian Alan Hess said the lack of buyers surprised him, given the house's renown and the number of people willing to pay millions for a single house. Conversely, the market for expensive houses was relatively small, and the house's existing national and city landmark designations made any potential modifications difficult, especially for a property with so few bedrooms.

== Media appearances ==
The Stahl House was made famous by one of Julius Shulman's photographs depicting two women there, part of a series taken as part of Job No. 2980. (Note: This is the job number given by the Getty Research Institute record of Shulman's work. Another source erroneously labels it as "Job No. 2950".) Shulman had wanted the entire set of photographs to bring attention to the design, saying: "You can have the best buildings in the world. but if they aren't photographed in published, they simply don't exist." Shulman's images of the Stahl and Bailey houses brought Koenig numerous subsequent architectural commissions, though Koenig later resented how Shulman got most of the credit for the Stahl House's fame. The house was frequently used as a film and photography site after the 1962 film Smog was shot there.

=== Use as a setting or filming location ===
Over the years, the Stahl House has been shown in over a thousand media works, including numerous fashion shoots and movies. It was one of several houses in the Los Angeles area that were frequently used for filmmaking due to their location inside the "studio zone", a circle extending 30 miles (48 km) from Hollywood. The Stahl family charged different rates depending on what type of film or photography shoot was being hosted there, though generally, these shoots netted several thousand dollars a day. Buck said in 1998 that his daily income from the house ranged between $1,000 for fashion shoots and $5,000 for film shoots, for a total gross income of $100,000–150,000 annually, though agents' fees took up about a third of that amount.

The first film to be shot in the house was Smog in 1962. The next time the house was used as a film shoot was in 1968, when it was used for Prescription: Murder, the pilot episode of the TV series Columbo. The TV shows Adam-12 and Emergency! were filmed there in the late 20th century, and the animated series The Simpsons depicted the house as well. The house was used for the music video of Wilson Phillips's 1990 song "Release Me". Afterward, the house became a frequent filming location. Kim Cross wrote in 2021 that, of the films shot there, none had depicted the Stahl House as the residence of a family with children, quoting Carlotta's observation that "in the movies, a glass house and children don't mix". Some parts of the house, such as the kitchen and bathroom, were also seldom depicted. Notable films shot there include:

Notable film appearances
| Year | Name | Notes |
|---|---|---|
| 1962 | Smog | |
| 1990 | The First Power | |
| 1991 | The Marrying Man | |
| 1994 | Corrina, Corrina | |
| 1998 | Playing by Heart | |
| 1998 | Why Do Fools Fall In Love | |
| 1999 | The Thirteenth Floor | |
| 1999 | Galaxy Quest | |
| 2000 | Nurse Betty | |
| 2005 | Where the Truth Lies | |
| 2016 | Knight of Cups | |

The house also hosted fashion shoots for Armani, Gucci, Miu Miu, Valentino, and J.Crew, along with advertisements for companies like Equinox. Models and actors such as Jennifer Garner, Christie Brinkley, Cameron Diaz, Gisele Bündchen, Paris Hilton, Lindsay Lohan, and the band Rascal Flatts, shot images there. By the early 2000s, it hosted over 50 fashion shoots a year. Although the Stahls often welcomed film crews into the house during their lifetimes, Carlotta prohibited nude photoshoots to preserve the house's reputation. Following one such photoshoot where a model was photographed in profile, Carlotta instituted another rule banning implied nudity.

==== Shulman photograph ====
Julius Shulman took several images of the house in 1960 (example pictured). One of the other images he took was widely disseminated.

Julius Shulman's most widely disseminated photograph of the house was taken on the evening of May 9, 1960. The two women in the image—variously described as Shulman's models, friends of his assistant or the girlfriends of two USC architecture students—sit in a corner with an evening panoramic view of the city through glass walls. He took the image from just outside the house, aligning his lens so it paralleled the street grid below. Shulman used a seven-minute exposure to capture the image, (Note: Sometimes described as a seven-and-a-half-minute exposure) orienting the camera so discreetly that, as the women later told him, they did not know they were being photographed. A variant of the image without the women was first published in the June 1960 edition of Arts & Architecture. The original image was later published by Life magazine and was exhibited in multiple US museums during the 1960s; it was later shown in a 2000 exhibition of Shulman's work.

The year the image of the two women was taken, it won first place in an architectural photography competition hosted by the American Institute of Architects (AIA). The photograph became a symbol of modern architecture and of mid-20th-century Los Angeles, and the British Journal of Photography said it became a "signature image" of Shulman's career. The photograph also became the best-known image from the Case Study House program. In 2016, Time magazine ranked it one of the 100 best images of all time, praising the photograph's forward-looking, aspirational feel and calling it "the most successful real estate image ever taken". Prints of the image came into high demand, and the Windsor Star wrote in 2022 that it "has now been published more than any photograph of any house since". The image also inspired a myriad of younger photographers and influenced perceptions of Los Angeles.

The Shulman photograph has drawn commentary for its symbolism, both of itself and of the house. The Los Angeles Times wrote that the photo encapsulated "the brief period when a handful of adventurous home designers tapped both their imaginations and post-World War II industrialism to try to build mass housing". The architectural professor Kevin Daly regarded the photograph as conveying both proximity to and distance from the city, and Reed Johnson of the Times said it provided a "still from a virtual movie that invites viewers to project their own desires". Koenig biographer Neil Jackson said the image "caught the spirit of the moment, the zeitgeist", at a time when the 1960s signified hope. Interiors magazine wrote that the image showed how the Stahl House's cantilevered, glass-clad design "appeared as a display case for the better life ahead". Apollo magazine conversely wrote that the photograph signified the "great manifestation of L.A.'s private wealth", since similar houses were typically placed in inaccessible locations.

=== Media about the house ===
Shortly after the house was completed, Buck Stahl was pictured in Life magazine wearing a rope while working on the site's gardens, though in reality he did not usually wear a rope. The Museum of Contemporary Art, Los Angeles (MOCA) exhibited a life-size replica of the house as part of an 1989 exhibit on Koenig's work; the replica copied most of the original furnishings but not the swimming pool, and it used television screens to emulate the view of the skyline. The MOCA exhibit helped restart Koenig's stagnant career and brought attention to the house. Jackson wrote that the MOCA exhibit made the Stahl House "the only Case Study House to be built twice". The Craig Krull Gallery in Santa Monica, California, hosted an exhibit with architectural drawings and Shulman's photographs of the Stahl and Bailey houses in 2002.

A look-alike of the house was included in the 2004 video game Grand Theft Auto: San Andreas and the house was also replicated in a Lego set. The artist Andy Burgess depicted the house in one of his paintings. The house has also inspired other visual artworks, such as a 2004 work by Shag depicting official Los Angeles landmarks, along with the Case Study Paintings series by Carrie Graber. It was included in books as well, such as a 2001 volume by Koenig's wife Gloria, Iconic L.A.: Stories of L.A.'s Most Memorable Buildings. Shari and Bruce Stahl collaborated with the author Kim Cross to write a book about the Stahl House, Case Study House #22, which was published in 2021. Before commissioning Cross, the Stahl siblings had spent several years looking for an author to write about the house.

== Impact and legacy ==
The Hollywood Reporter described the house as possibly the city's most famous, and Los Angeles magazine wrote that the Stahl House was "published more often than Frank Lloyd Wright's Fallingwater". GQ magazine said that, after Fallingwater, the Stahl House was the world's most photographed house, and Koenig's son, the architectural lawyer Randy Koenig, said that officials from the Frank Lloyd Wright Foundation regularly congratulated him for the fame of his father's design. When Pierre Koenig died in 2004, Interior Design magazine wrote that the Stahl House was the building for which he was best known, and The New York Times stated that the Bailey and Stahl houses had formed a large part of his reputation as an architect. The design helped inspire Niall McLaughlin Architects' Jacob's Ladder house, located in the Chiltern Hills of southeast England.

=== Reception ===
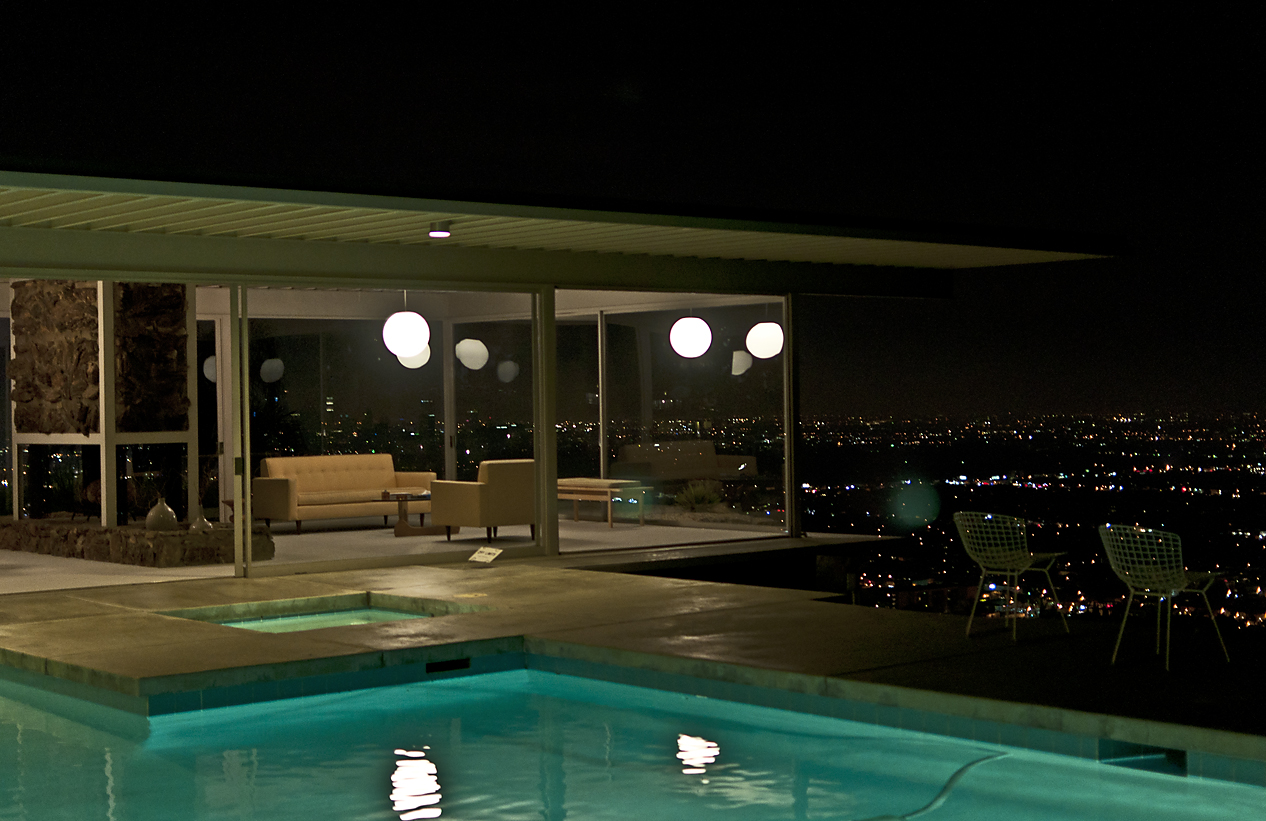
The house seen at night

When the house was built, the Los Angeles Times wrote that "simplicity is the keynote of the home" and that the views from the house were prioritized above all other aspects of the design. At the 1989 MOCA exhibition, an Orlando Sentinel reporter wrote that the house's style, at its best, "combines the pure and the sensuous, the visionary and the romantic". Architecture: The AIA Journal wrote in 1999 that the design's "utter rationality and transparency" was the house's "most compelling" feature. Conversely, one writer said that the Stahl House was not "readily identifiable as [an] L.A. landmark" as other structures such as the Watts Towers, Griffith Observatory, and Mission San Fernando Rey de España were.

The house was included among the city's ten best houses in a 2008 Los Angeles Times survey of experts. The Architects' Journal wrote the same year that the house was "certainly a victory for domestically-applied industrial technologies", in large part because of the renown brought by Shulman's images. Elizabeth Smith, an expert on the Case Study houses, said in 2009: "Koenig adhered to the basic attributes of Stahl's concept but refined the design into something much more rigorous, geometric and 'pure' in its form and materials—in essence adapting it to his own vocabulary." During the 2010s, Edwin Heathcote of the Financial Times wrote that the house's minimalist design made it seem "as if it were all set up for that one Shulman shot", and the Los Angeles Times said that the views from the house, rather than the design or layout, made the house stand out. The Austin-American Statesman wrote in 2014 that the interior still evoked "Mad Men-era cool", and a writer for Los Angeles magazine wrote the next year, "The city around the Stahl House has changed, but the house itself has not."

Architectural Record wrote in 2022 that "No Case Study project was more quintessentially Modernist than the two-bedroom #22". When the building was placed for sale in 2025, one broker referred to it as "L.A.'s confidence distilled into a home", and SFGate wrote that it was "a modest but mighty sentry" overlooking the city below. House and Garden magazine wrote that the Stahl House "epitomises the seamless blend of indoor and outdoor living with its jutting roof that extends over a shaded poolside area".

=== Landmark designations ===
In 1999, the house was declared a Los Angeles Historic-Cultural Monument, following advocacy from Michael LaFetra, an actor who lived in the Bailey House. In 2007, the AIA listed the Stahl House 140th among the top 150 structures on its "America's Favorite Architecture" list, one of only eleven in Southern California, and the only privately owned home on the list. The Stahl House, along with nine other remaining Case Study houses, were added to the National Register of Historic Places (NRHP) in 2013. The Stahl House, registered as NRHP landmark number #13000519, is one of eleven Case Study houses on the NRHP; the other house, the Eames House, was previously added to the register in 2006.

== See also ==
- Los Angeles Historic-Cultural Monuments in Hollywood
- National Register of Historic Places listings in Los Angeles
