= Bailey House (Los Angeles) =

Historic house in California, United States

- The Bailey House (Case Study House No. 21)
- U.S. National Register of Historic Places
- Los Angeles Historic-Cultural Monument
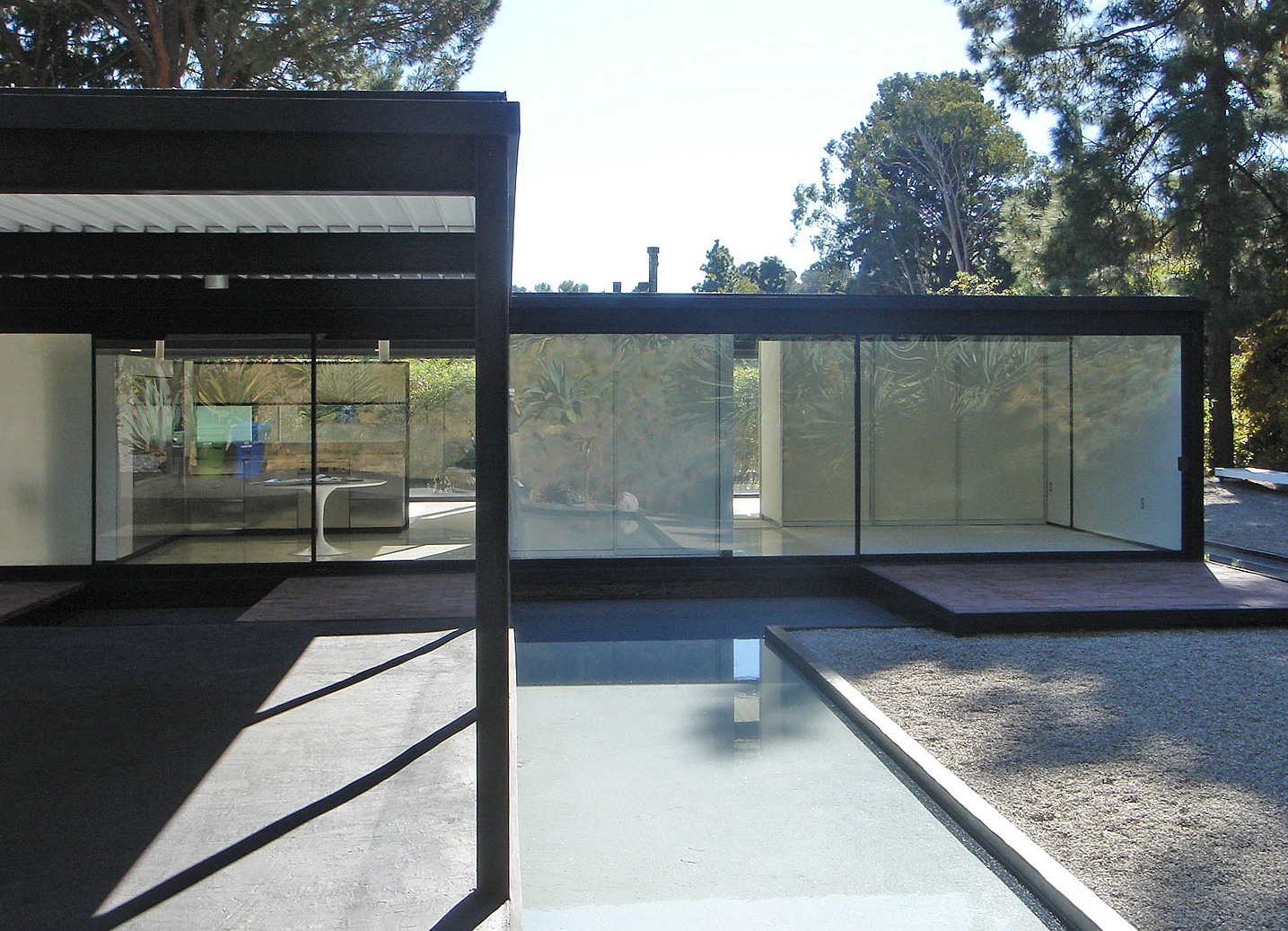
- The Bailey House, Case Study House #21

- Location within the Los Angeles metropolitan area
- Location: 9038 Wonderland Park Ave, Los Angeles, California
- Coordinates: 34.116634°N 118.391623°W
- Built: 1959
- Architect: Pierre Koenig
- Architectural style: Modern
- NRHP reference No.: 13000518
- LAHCM No.: 669

Significant dates
- Added to NRHP: July 24, 2013
- Designated LAHCM: November 9, 1999

The Bailey House (also known as Case Study House No. 21) is a steel-framed modernist house in the Hollywood Hills of Los Angeles, California, United States. It was designed by Pierre Koenig as part of the Case Study Houses program. It was registered as Los Angeles Historic-Cultural Monument #669, with the endorsement of then-owner Michael LaFetra, the Los Angeles Conservancy, as well as Pierre and Gloria Koenig.

== The Case Study House Program ==
In January 1945 John Entenza, the editor and publisher of Arts & Architecture magazine, announced the Case Study House Program (CSHP). The program was envisioned as a creative response to the impending building boom expected to follow the housing shortages of the Great Depression and World War II. Entenza encouraged participating architects to use donated materials from industry and manufacturers to create low-cost, modern housing prototypes that might foster a dialogue between architectural professionals and laymen.

The highly publicized program ran from 1945 to 1964, spanning thirty-six individual designs, many of which were never constructed. The initial program announcement stated that "each house must be capable of duplication and in no sense be an individual performance" and that "the overall program will be general enough to be of practical assistance to the average American in search of a home in which he can afford to live."

After returning from four years of fighting in WWII, Pierre Koenig was introduced to the CSHP through the ongoing publication of the avant-garde designs in Arts & Architecture magazine. By 1948 Koenig's interest in modern architecture led him to transfer from Pasadena City College to the School of Architecture at the University of Southern California where he studied under Richard Neutra and Gregory Ain. In 1950, while enrolled at USC, Koenig designed and built his first steel-framed house for himself and his family.

Koenig's first involvement with the Case Study House Program occurred while working in the office of Raphael Soriano on the Case Study House 1950 project. In 1956 he worked briefly with Archibald Quincy Jones on a steel house in San Mateo, California for the prominent property developer Joseph Eichler. Eichler and John Entenza were well acquainted and both were developing a keen interest in the potential of lightweight steel construction for residential architecture.

Koenig's hands-on experience with steel construction and his mastery of the new arc welding process on the San Mateo house would prove influential for the rest of his architectural career. Entenza saw great potential in Koenig's design work of the time and offered him a tentative invitation to participate in the CSHP when he "found the right house and the right client." This period marked the beginning of what historian Esther McCoy would later identify as the second phase of the Case Study House Program, represented by "a concerted effort… to bring architecture into relationship with the machine."

== The Bailey Commission ==
In early 1957 psychologist Walter Bailey and his wife Mary commissioned Pierre Koenig to design a 1,200-1,300 square foot house upon a level site nestled within a Hollywood Hills canyon. The Baileys were later described in Arts & Architecture magazine as a "contemporary-minded" couple with no children and an informal lifestyle. This represented the ideal program for Koenig to realize steel framings potential to achieve a truly open plan design that capitalized upon the vast spans that steel facilitated.

By May 1958 Koenig had completed his construction drawings and begun collaboration with factories that were capable of producing the prefabricated steel bents. The bulk of construction took place from August to November of the same year, and by January 1959 the house was officially completed.

== Publication ==
In February 1959 Case Study House #21 was published in Arts & Architecture and was lauded as "some of the cleanest and most immaculate thinking in the development of the small contemporary house." As was standard for all CSHP participants, the house was opened to the public for several weeks of viewing.

A year later in 1960, a photographer named Julius Shulman (himself a Case Study client) was invited to photograph the Bailey House. The photographs he took would later become iconic symbols of California Modernism. As one article for L’Uomo Vogue described, Shulman's architectural photographs of Case Study House #21 and #22 have "an enduring resonance and iconic power. Taken on the eve of America’s involvement in Vietnam they record the last glorious moments of American post-war hegemony and self-confidence and its unquestioned belief in the benefits of progress and technology."

Nearly thirty years later in 1989 Shulman's photographs of the Case Study Houses were exhibited at the Los Angeles Museum of Contemporary Art in an exhibit titled "Blueprints for Modern Living" which would ignite a "groundswell of interest in Modernism" and renewed appreciation for Koenig's contribution to the California Modern movement, which had been largely forgotten during the 1970s and ‘80s.

== Significant alterations ==
About 1969 Dr. and Mrs. Bailey relocated to the East Coast for professional reasons and put Case Study House #21 up for sale. Sadly, over the next thirty years a succession of owners exhibited "weaker commitments to maintenance and preservation" than the Baileys had demonstrated. Numerous ad-hoc renovations wreaked havoc upon the original design. Among these were the installation of several skylights and a fireplace.

In the 1980s Koenig's original kitchen was demolished and was replaced with a center-island cooking station. The slab-like white-vinyl-tiled floors that Koenig originally specified were replaced with wide-grout ceramic tiles. Years later Koenig would describe his impressions of the altered house by stating: "even though I knew what had been going on in this house it was a great shock to see it. My houses are like children to me."

In 1997 an admirer of Julius Shulman's photography, film producer Dan Cracchiolo expressed interest in the Bailey House after seeing some of Shulman's photographs. He made an offer on the property of $1.5 million. The offer was accepted and Cracchiolo immediately commissioned Pierre Koenig to assist with ‘resuscitating’ the original design.

The meticulous restoration that followed would last for over a year, nearly twice the duration of the original construction. In recalling the process Koenig later described the difficulty of "finding the parts." The mosaic tile that covered the walls of the interior courtyard proved particularly challenging. Restoring the essence of the original kitchen with state-of-the-art appliances also proved difficult. The wall-hung refrigerator of the original design was no longer in production by General Electric so Koenig modified three under-counter Sub-Zero Refrigerators by inverting the motor locations to conform to the plan. Koenig also retrofitted the house with state-of-the-art mechanical and lighting elements including an updated water heater and furnace housed in the utility core. When the process was nearly complete Koenig reflected on the restoration acknowledging "a weird sense of déjà vu in working on the same building forty years after I built it the first time" but confessing "a wonderful feeling about getting it right, again."

Cracchiolo was not content with a purely architectural restoration and pursued reinstatement of the original furnishings as well. To replace the long-discontinued Formica entry cabinet shown in the famous Julius Schulman photograph, Cracchiolo commissioned Jerry McCabe, the original manufacturer, to repeat the design. Likewise, a black Naugahyde sofa was commissioned to the exact specifications of the original.

In a July 1999 Architectural Digest article describing the restoration process Cracchiolo acknowledged feeling "an edgy ambivalence between wanting, on the one hand, to restore Case Study #21 to its original condition of fifties ‘purity’ and, on the other to allow more expression of his own nineties needs and tastes." One example he describes is his desire to display books rather than leaving the walls as pure and bare as the original Shulman photographs depict. In 2001 Pierre Koenig received the City of Los Angeles historic Preservation 2000 Award of excellence for his beautiful restoration of the Bailey House.

Shortly after publication of the Architectural Digest article Michael LaFetra, a film producer who had been looking for modern architecture properties, came across the article and resolved to purchase the property. It came on the market shortly after and LaFetra’s offer was accepted. Within a week of the purchase LaFetra received a phone message from Pierre Koenig stating: "Hello, this is Pierre, your architect, and I want to talk." Soon after LaFetra was told by Koenig that "he ought not to have to change anything in the house but, if he needed to, he should get in touch with him."

Soon after a friendship began and by 2000 LaFetra had commissioned Koenig to design a new home for him on a beachfront lot in Malibu. After ensuring protection for Case Study House #21 by registering it as a Los Angeles Historic-Cultural Monument, the house was put on the market in 2002 to pay for the new construction. With Koenig's permission LaFetra began work on a documentary to cover the design and construction process, but sadly in 2004 Koenig succumbed to leukemia and died April 4 of that year.

== Current condition ==
In July 2006, Julius Shulman (at age 95) was invited to revisit Case Study House #21 to photograph it in its modern condition for the catalog of an upcoming auction at Wright 20. On December 3, 2006, the property sold for $3,185,600 to a female art collector from South Korea. The sale represented the second highest price of a Modern house at auction, behind Mies van der Rohe’s Farnsworth House, which sold for $8 million. Reports of the sale describe it as a "watershed moment" in the public acceptance of Modernism as art, rather than real estate.

Shulman's latest photographs offer a unique glimpse into the precision of Koenig's restoration. Although Koenig's completed house is nearly exact to the original design, subtle changes are present. Among these are a slightly altered tiling layout for the inner courtyard wall and a more elaborate fountain mechanism below. The can-like lights that are present throughout the space appear to have a darkened patina applied as compared to the original lacquered fixtures. Additionally, Cracchiolo apparently requested the introduction of semi-translucent glass on the bathroom walls for increased privacy.

The Bailey House, along with nine of the other remaining Case Study houses, were added to the National Register of Historic Places in 2013. In November 2016, the home went up for sale at a price of $4.5 million. It wound up selling for $3.26 million in February 2019 to Alison Sarofim, who began another renovation project later that year. Soil under the home's foundation had subsided and Mark Haddaway was brought in to stabilize the residence and prevent further slippage.

== Description ==
In describing his concept for Case Study House #21, Koenig stated "I was trying to develop" 1,300 square feet (120 m^{2}) "in an efficient, social, and exciting plan that people could afford… I had thrown out all conventional thought because I had no patience with anything that had been done before." The Case Study program called for the design of mass-producible prototypes and Koenig appears to have accomplished this while adequately addressing site-specific factors.

CSH #21 is arranged along a north–south axis with a carport on the North side and a fully glazed South side to take advantage of the best view and maximum sunlight for winter months. Koenig opted for a compressed L-shaped plan to establish a linear progression from the carport and entry through the living space and out to the garden. This compression is achieved by opaque, steel decking walls blocking the unattractive views towards the "scrubby hillside" on the West and Wonderland Park Avenue on the East.

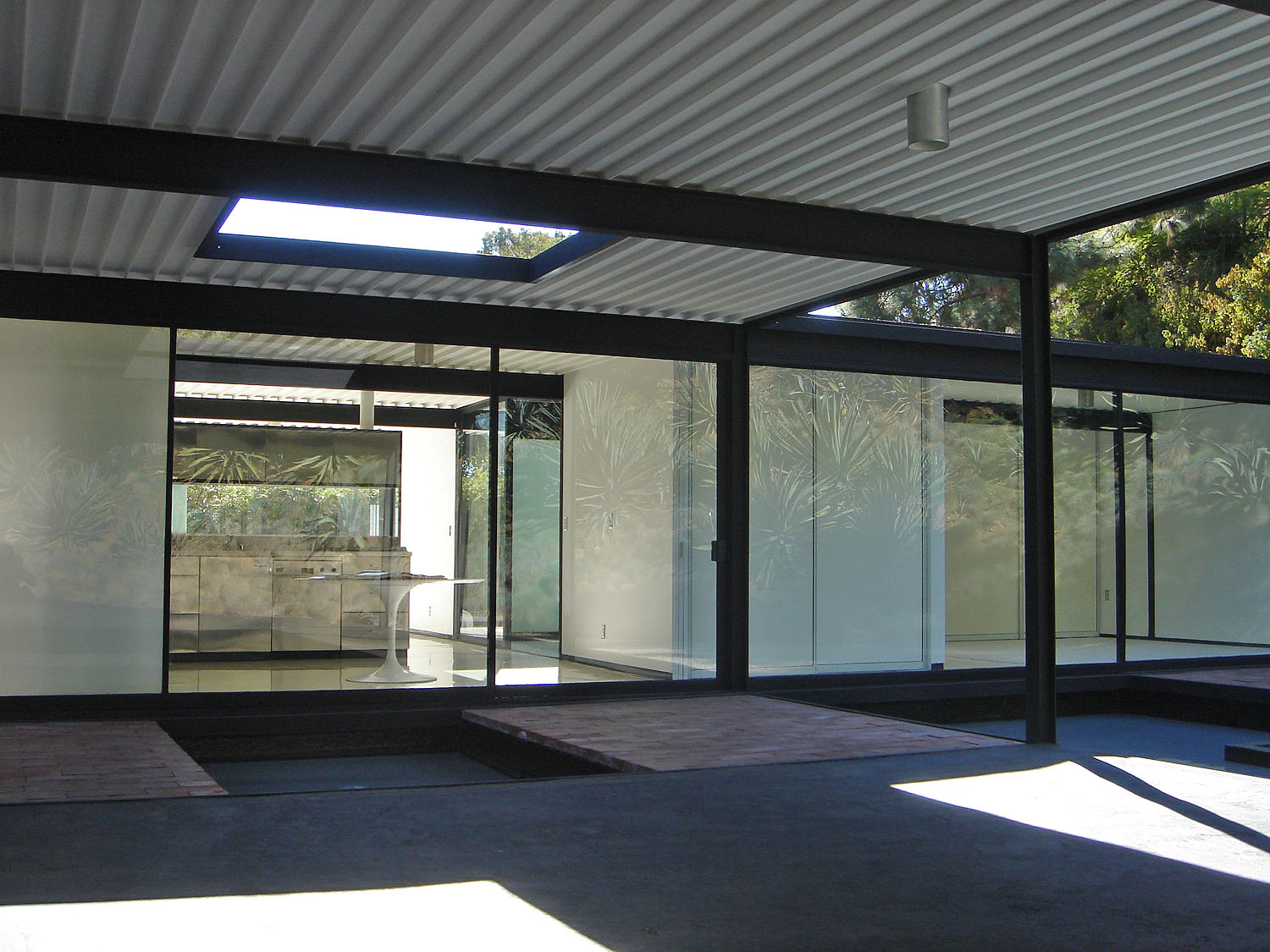
View into the house

The main house is a 30 by 44 feet (9.1 m × 13.4 m) rectangular plan with a solid rectangular core housing the utilities – two full bathrooms and a mechanical room. Beyond this core lay two efficiently arranged bedrooms. The threshold through this interior courtyard/core provides increased privacy (visually and acoustically) for the bedrooms. By designing a central service core Koenig simplified the language of the perimeter condition to either standard sized sliding glass doors or opaque steel walls. The simplicity of the material vocabulary is what John Entenza found most appealing. When first visiting the house he described it as "a very pristine, clean design. Two details, one north–south, one east–west. One material for the roof, same one for the walls. Minimal house, maximum space."

The steel framing system of the house is composed of four prefabricated steel bents 44 feet (13 m) wide and 9 feet (2.7 m) high, forming the interior of the house. In addition, three half-span bents are used to frame the covered carport. Koenig specified identical structure to the houses he worked on with Soriano and Jones – 8-inch (200 mm) I-section beams and 4-inch (100 mm) H-section columns. Rather than use a standardized 8’ dimension, Koenig opted for a 10 feet (3.0 m) spacing between bents for economy and to streamline the overall structure. Koenig frequently stated, "Steel is only as good as its detailing. In order to make exposed steel acceptable in the living room it must be so well detailed that the joining connections are imperceptible."

Indicative of the changing context, the property is now surrounded by tall trees and shrubbery, replacing what was once a grand view to the south. This is clearly an adaptation to achieve greater privacy within the now densely populated Hollywood Hills canyon. As an article in House Beautiful magazine described, today "the building’s defiant simplicity stands in stark contrast to the fussy over-scaled residences that sit high on the hills behind it."

== Evaluation ==
=== Technical ===
The rigidity of the steel framing provided sufficient lateral stability in the east–west direction, and the welding of channels to the top and base of each columns provided additional strength in the north–south direction for resistance to seismic forces and wind loads. These expressed elements unify the building aesthetically and structurally.

Koenig made use of the sandwiched steel decking walls to conceal insulation, wiring and pipes. By piercing the roof over the bathroom and utility areas, even the core of the house has access to exterior elements such as daylight, rain, and plantings. This feature also provides an acoustical buffer between living and sleeping areas and underscores the airy, natural feel of the house.

The furnace in utility core supplies heat to the main space through heating ducts, which are arranged along the base of the glass walls for maximum efficiency. During the winter the lack of overhangs provides maximum passive heat gain, and use of the original Koolshade panels was meant to minimize excessive heat gain in the summer.

The circulation of pond water up to the gutters and back down through the roof scuppers represents an early experiment with environmental control systems. As James Steele described in his monograph of Pierre Koenig, "the strategy is both pragmatic and lyrical; the water has some cooling properties and the hard building edge at the ground level is softened by the reflective surface." Additionally, this circulation eliminates the need for chemical treatment of the water.

=== Social ===
Although architects of the second phase of the Case Study House Program never gave up their belief in the potential of steel framing for residential construction, the public never embraced the material. As Elizabeth A. T. Smith explained: "Unfortunately, the economic pressures of the era were pushing residential construction another way, to accommodate the merchant builders working to deskill building tradesman and architects, and to glorify the add-ons and fix-ups of Mr. Homeowner and Mrs. Consumer, the stock characters of American advertising lobbying of the 1920s and 30s." Although they imagined factory-based industrial materials could be more economical than traditional wood framing, this was never realized. As such steel-framing faced social and economical obstacles. In the end, the Levittown paradigm would dominate America's mass housing strategy in the post-war era.

=== Cultural and aesthetic ===
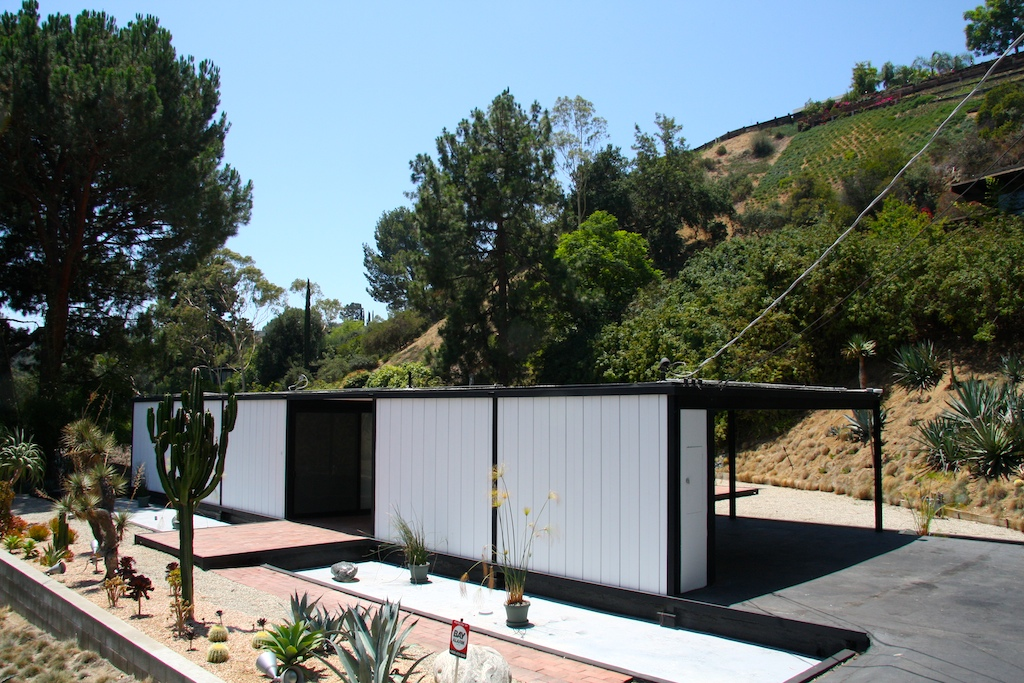
View from the approach to the house, its ponds drained

By painting the walls and ceiling white and maintaining the factory-applied charcoal Perma-Bar sealer coating on the steel, Koenig created visual emphasis on the structural skeleton. By expressing the volume as a simple box without overhangs Koenig underscored the simplicity of the rectangular forms and achieved an understated elegance.

The fully glazed North and South walls blur the interior and exterior – a common goal of the Case Study Houses. Describing the aesthetic goals of the movement Koenig would later explain: "We moved garages to the front and living rooms to the back to put them closer to the yard… We used steel, which in addition to being economical gave us a different living environment. It opened up the plan, letting us use more glass to create more light, which helped heighten the relationship of the interior to the exterior."

Koenig's inclusion of the ponds around the perimeter of the house allows the structure to read as if it is floating. As Elizabeth A.T. Smith described in Blueprints for Modern Living, "reflections of trees and sky intermingled on the water’s surface with the pure lines of the house’s contour…humanized through the merging of the technological with the natural."

=== Historical ===
Although CSH #22 is more recognizable, CSH#21 is arguably the finest example of Pierre Koenig's steel-framed houses. It is widely considered to represent the highest point of the Case Study House Program's success. As Neil Jackson stated in his monograph of Koenig, "The Bailey House represents the ultimate refinement of an ideal developed by Koenig in his early houses and built upon through his experience with Soriano and Quincy Jones. It was the simplest of solutions achieved in, apparently, the most effortless way and was a remarkable achievement for such a young man."

David Hay summarized the original and continuing importance of the house, stating "Back then, Case Study House 21 was a brilliant response to the design spirit prevalent in Los Angeles — "be modern, be decisive." Now in its restored state, it is a powerful reminder of a time in southern California when architecture insisted on invention."

== See also ==
- List of Los Angeles Historic-Cultural Monuments on the Westside
