= Case Study Houses =

Experimental buildings in California, US

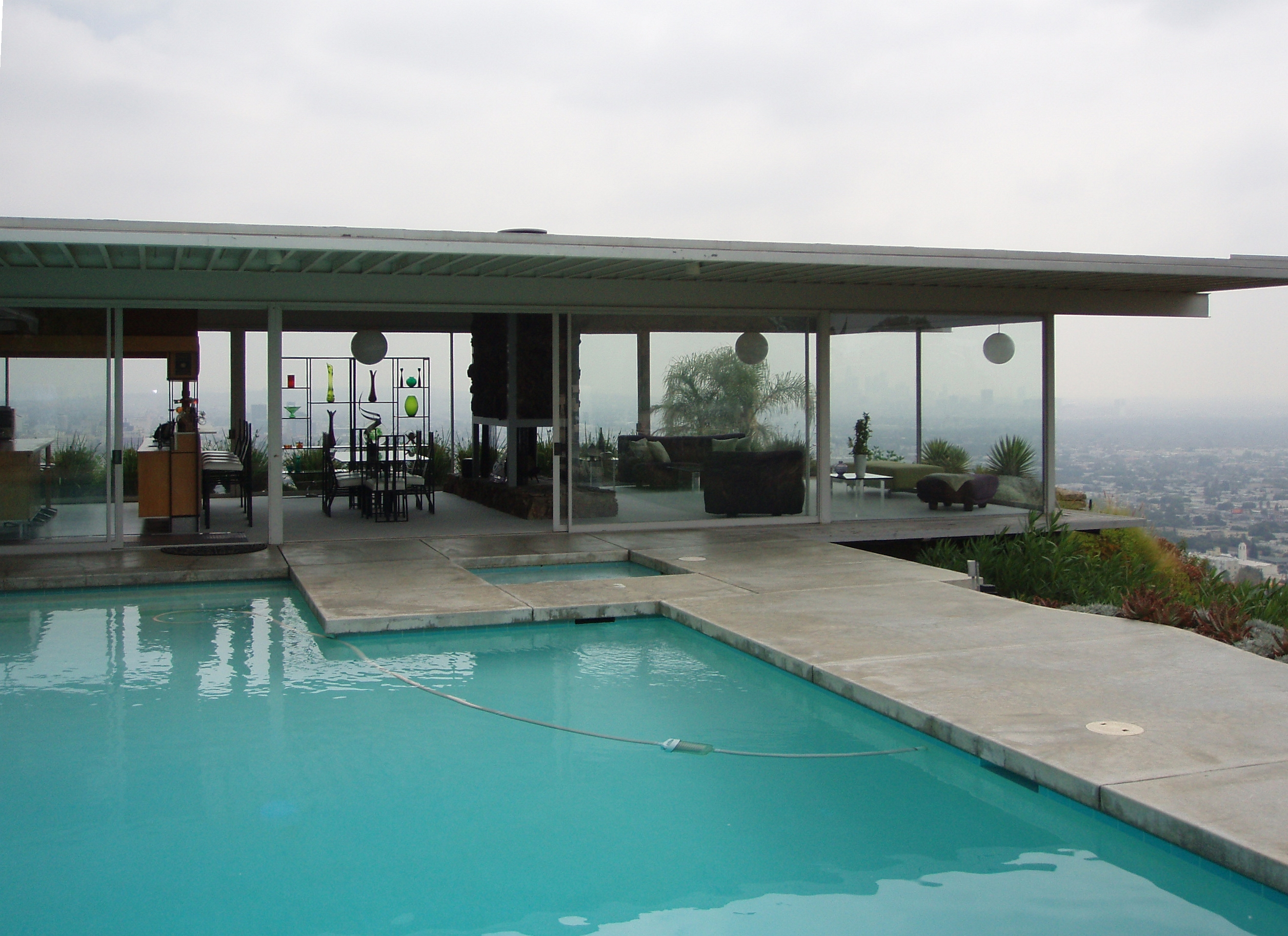
The Stahl House, Case Study House #22

The Case Study Houses were experiments in American residential architecture sponsored by Arts & Architecture magazine, which commissioned major architects of the day to design and build inexpensive and efficient model homes for the United States residential housing boom caused by the end of World War II and the return of millions of soldiers. The program yielded 36 designs and 25 constructed homes, concentrated in Southern California.

== History ==
The "Case Study" House program, spearheaded by Arts & Architecture editor John Entenza, was announced in the January 1945 issue of the magazine. The magazine initially commissioned eight nationally known architects to create contemporary single-family homes within a specified budget, with the magazine itself serving as the "client" for each project.

The program was envisioned as a creative response to the impending building boom expected to follow the housing shortages of the Great Depression and World War II. The initial program announcement stated that "each house must be capable of duplication and in no sense be an individual performance" and that "the overall program will be general enough to be of practical assistance to the average American in search of a home in which he can afford to live." Entenza encouraged participating architects to use donated materials from industry and manufacturers to create low-cost, modern housing prototypes that might foster a dialogue between architectural professionals and laymen.

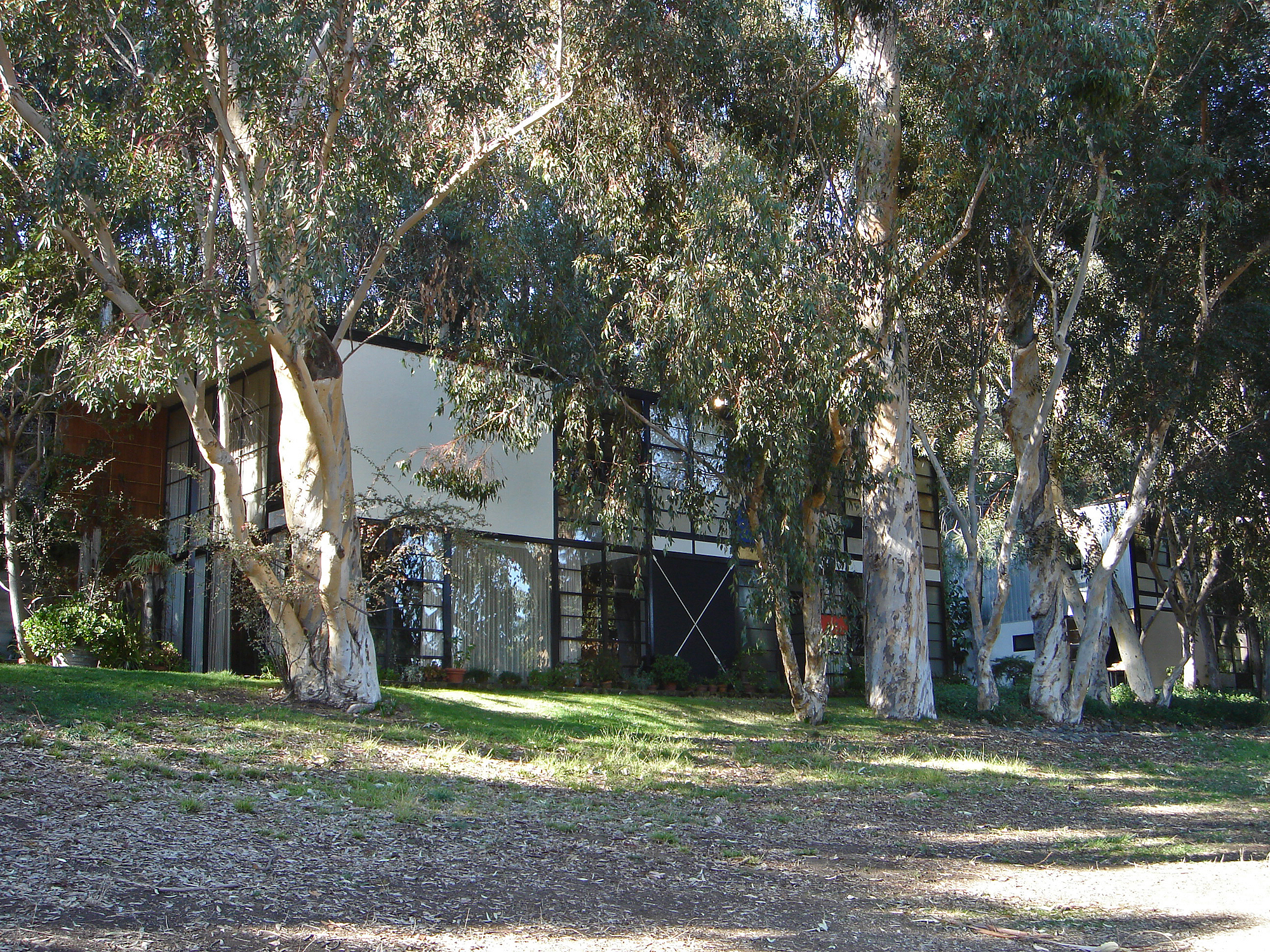
The Eames House (Case Study House No. 8) was designed by Charles Eames, one of the first eight architects commissioned and profiled in the January 1945 announcement of the program.

The first eight architects commissioned and profiled in the January 1945 announcement of the program were JR Davidson, Sumner Spaulding, Richard Neutra, Eero Saarinen, William Wilson Wurster, Charles Eames, and Ralph Rapson. The program employed a "design-build-publish" model, publishing the prototypes alongside the architects' comments. JR Davidson's design was the first feature of the series, with the exteriors and interiors appearing in the February and March 1945 edition of Arts & Architecture, respectively. Davidson's design was labeled Case Study House #1, thus inaugurating the numbering convention, which refers to the order in which designs were published, rather than constructed.

As outlined in the program announcement, construction was intended to commence immediately following the World War II moratorium on domestic housing construction. Case Study House #11, also designed by Davidson, was the first house constructed, and was permitted in December 1945. Construction on Case Study House #11 began on January 9, 1946, prompting the design for the home to precede the publication of Case Study House #10.

The program announcement called for each house to be open to the public for six to eight weeks upon the conclusion of construction. Houses were to be furnished "under a working arrangement between the architect, the designer, and the furniture manufacturer". By January 1949, the magazine had published designs, models, for 19 houses. Of the 19 profiled, nine houses were complete and five were "in various stages of construction." Several houses were not constructed for unspecified reasons beyond the control of the magazine and architects.

In January 1949, the magazine announced "having come this far with it, we feel that we have proved our point to the extent that we need no longer be so ambitious as to numbers," and pivoted to sponsoring one house each year, starting with Case Study House 1949. By July 1954, the program had yielded 16 constructed houses.

In total, the program commissioned 36 prototypes, including single-family homes, multi-family homes, and apartments, of which 25 were constructed. The majority of the constructed houses were built in Los Angeles County. Additional case study houses were built in San Rafael, California; San Diego, California; and Phoenix, Arizona. Of the unbuilt houses, #19 was to have been built in Atherton, California, while #27 was to have been built in Smoke Rise, New Jersey.

The Eames House was added in its own right to the National Register of Historic Places as a National Historic Landmark in 2006. In 2013, a group of 10 Case Study houses, all located in Southern California, were added to the register, while House #23A was determined eligible for the registry, but not officially listed due to an objection by the owner.

=== Shulman photographs ===
Many of the houses appeared in the magazine in iconic black-and-white photographs by architectural photographer Julius Shulman. Shulman's May 1960 photo of the Stahl House is widely regarded as one of the most famous architectural photos of Los Angeles, and is one of Shulman's most reproduced photos.

In 1989 Shulman's photographs of the Case Study Houses program's houses were exhibited at the Los Angeles Museum of Contemporary Art in an exhibit titled "Blueprints for Modern Living". The exhibition had a major role in reintroducing and redefining the program to a more modern audience. Some photographs of the constructed Case Study houses and models are included in Getty Research Institute's Julius Shulman Photography Archive.

== Stylistic commonalities ==
Houses in the program shared common design elements, including open floor plans, clean lines, floor to ceiling glass, steel framing, and a flat roof. Most of the houses were "predominately modular in design," featuring exposed structures. Virtually all of the homes featured open floor plans.

== Houses ==
House	Alternate Name	Architect(s)	Status	Address	Arts & Architecture Publications	
House	Alternate Name	Architect(s)	Status	Address	Content	Edition
1		JR Davidson	Extant	10152 Toluca Lake Avenue, Los Angeles	Plan	February 1945
1		JR Davidson	Extant	10152 Toluca Lake Avenue, Los Angeles	Model	March 1945
1		JR Davidson	Extant	10152 Toluca Lake Avenue, Los Angeles	Restudy	May 1948
2		Sumner Spaulding, John Rex	Extant	857 Chapea Road, Pasadena	Plan	April 1945
2		Sumner Spaulding, John Rex	Extant	857 Chapea Road, Pasadena	Model	May 1945
2		Sumner Spaulding, John Rex	Extant	857 Chapea Road, Pasadena	Restudy	October/November 1946
2		Sumner Spaulding, John Rex	Extant	857 Chapea Road, Pasadena	Completion	August 1947
3		William Wurster, Theodore Bernardi	Demolished	13187 Chalon Road, Los Angeles	Plan	June 1945
3		William Wurster, Theodore Bernardi	Demolished	13187 Chalon Road, Los Angeles	Model	July 1945
3		William Wurster, Theodore Bernardi	Demolished	13187 Chalon Road, Los Angeles	Completion	March 1949
4	Greenbelt House	Ralph Rapson	Unbuilt		Plan	August 1945
4	Greenbelt House	Ralph Rapson	Unbuilt		Model	September 1945
5	Loggia House	Whitney R. Smith	Unbuilt		Plan	September 1945
5	Loggia House	Whitney R. Smith	Unbuilt		Model	April 1946
6	Omega	Richard Neutra	Unbuilt		Plan, Model	October 1945
7		Thornton Abell	Extant	6236 N Deerfield Avenue, San Gabriel	Plan	November 1945
7		Thornton Abell	Extant	6236 N Deerfield Avenue, San Gabriel	Model	May 1946
7		Thornton Abell	Extant	6236 N Deerfield Avenue, San Gabriel	Restudy	April 1947
7		Thornton Abell	Extant	6236 N Deerfield Avenue, San Gabriel	Construction	June 1948
7		Thornton Abell	Extant	6236 N Deerfield Avenue, San Gabriel	Completion	July 1948
8	Eames House	Eames Office (Charles Eames, Ray Eames)	Extant	203 Chautauqua Way, Pacific Palisades	Plan	December 1945
8	Eames House	Eames Office (Charles Eames, Ray Eames)	Extant	203 Chautauqua Way, Pacific Palisades	Model	March 1948
8	Eames House	Eames Office (Charles Eames, Ray Eames)	Extant	203 Chautauqua Way, Pacific Palisades	Site	February 1949
8	Eames House	Eames Office (Charles Eames, Ray Eames)	Extant	203 Chautauqua Way, Pacific Palisades	Framing	March 1949
8	Eames House	Eames Office (Charles Eames, Ray Eames)	Extant	203 Chautauqua Way, Pacific Palisades	Plan	May 1949
8	Eames House	Eames Office (Charles Eames, Ray Eames)	Extant	203 Chautauqua Way, Pacific Palisades	Merit Specified Products	July 1949
8	Eames House	Eames Office (Charles Eames, Ray Eames)	Extant	203 Chautauqua Way, Pacific Palisades	Merit Specified Products	August 1949
8	Eames House	Eames Office (Charles Eames, Ray Eames)	Extant	203 Chautauqua Way, Pacific Palisades	Interiors	September 1949
8	Eames House	Eames Office (Charles Eames, Ray Eames)	Extant	203 Chautauqua Way, Pacific Palisades	Completion	December 1949
9	Entenza House	Charles Eames, Eero Saarinen	Extant	205 Chautauqua Way, Pacific Palisades	Plan	December 1945
9	Entenza House	Charles Eames, Eero Saarinen	Extant	205 Chautauqua Way, Pacific Palisades	Model	March 1948
9	Entenza House	Charles Eames, Eero Saarinen	Extant	205 Chautauqua Way, Pacific Palisades	Construction	January 1949
9	Entenza House	Charles Eames, Eero Saarinen	Extant	205 Chautauqua Way, Pacific Palisades	Merit Specified Products	July 1949
9	Entenza House	Charles Eames, Eero Saarinen	Extant	205 Chautauqua Way, Pacific Palisades	Merit Specified Products	August 1949
9	Entenza House	Charles Eames, Eero Saarinen	Extant	205 Chautauqua Way, Pacific Palisades	Merit Specified Products, Completion	July 1950
10		Kemper Nomland, Kemper Nomland Jr.	Significantly Altered	711 San Rafael Avenue, Pasadena, CA 91105	Completion	October 1947
11		JR Davidson	Demolished	540 S Barrington Avenue, Los Angeles	Plan, Model	January 1946
11		JR Davidson	Demolished	540 S Barrington Avenue, Los Angeles	Completion	July 1946
11		JR Davidson	Demolished	540 S Barrington Avenue, Los Angeles	Tenancy Study	March 1947
12	Lath House	Whitney R. Smith	Unbuilt		Plan	February 1946
12	Lath House	Whitney R. Smith	Unbuilt		Model	December 1946
13	Alpha	Richard Neutra	Unbuilt		Plan, Model	March 1946
15		JR Davidson	Extant	4755 Lasheart Drive, La Cañada Flintridge	Plan, Construction	January 1947
16 [Walker]		Rodney Walker	Demolished	9945 Beverly Grove Drive, Beverly Hills	Plan, Construction	June 1946
16 [Walker]		Rodney Walker	Demolished	9945 Beverly Grove Drive, Beverly Hills	Garden	August 1946
16 [Walker]		Rodney Walker	Demolished	9945 Beverly Grove Drive, Beverly Hills	Model	September 1946
16 [Walker]		Rodney Walker	Demolished	9945 Beverly Grove Drive, Beverly Hills	Completion	February 1947
16 [Ellwood]	Salzman House, Case Study House 1953	Craig Ellwood	Extant	1811 Bel Air Rd, Los Angeles	Merit Specifications	August 1951
16 [Ellwood]	Salzman House, Case Study House 1953	Craig Ellwood	Extant	1811 Bel Air Rd, Los Angeles	Merit Specifications	April 1952
16 [Ellwood]	Salzman House, Case Study House 1953	Craig Ellwood	Extant	1811 Bel Air Rd, Los Angeles	Merit Specifications	May 1952
16 [Ellwood]	Salzman House, Case Study House 1953	Craig Ellwood	Extant	1811 Bel Air Rd, Los Angeles	Merit Specifications	June 1952
16 [Ellwood]	Salzman House, Case Study House 1953	Craig Ellwood	Extant	1811 Bel Air Rd, Los Angeles	Merit Specifications	July 1952
16 [Ellwood]	Salzman House, Case Study House 1953	Craig Ellwood	Extant	1811 Bel Air Rd, Los Angeles	Merit Specifications	August 1952
16 [Ellwood]	Salzman House, Case Study House 1953	Craig Ellwood	Extant	1811 Bel Air Rd, Los Angeles	Merit Specifications	September 1952
16 [Ellwood]	Salzman House, Case Study House 1953	Craig Ellwood	Extant	1811 Bel Air Rd, Los Angeles	Merit Specifications	November 1952
16 [Ellwood]	Salzman House, Case Study House 1953	Craig Ellwood	Extant	1811 Bel Air Rd, Los Angeles	Merit Specifications	December 1952
16 [Ellwood]	Salzman House, Case Study House 1953	Craig Ellwood	Extant	1811 Bel Air Rd, Los Angeles	Construction	February 1953
16 [Ellwood]	Salzman House, Case Study House 1953	Craig Ellwood	Extant	1811 Bel Air Rd, Los Angeles	Merit Specifications	March 1953
16 [Ellwood]	Salzman House, Case Study House 1953	Craig Ellwood	Extant	1811 Bel Air Rd, Los Angeles	Merit Specifications	April 1953
16 [Ellwood]	Salzman House, Case Study House 1953	Craig Ellwood	Extant	1811 Bel Air Rd, Los Angeles	Completion, Merit Specifications	June 1953
16 [Ellwood]	Salzman House, Case Study House 1953	Craig Ellwood	Extant	1811 Bel Air Rd, Los Angeles	Heating	July 1953
17 [Walker]		Rodney Walker	Extant	7861 Woodrow Wilson Drive, Hollywood	Plan, Model	September 1946
17 [Walker]		Rodney Walker	Extant	7861 Woodrow Wilson Drive, Hollywood	Completion	July 1947
17 [Ellwood]		Craig Ellwood	Remodeled beyond recognition	9554 Hidden Valley Road, Beverly Hills	Announcement	July 1954
17 [Ellwood]		Craig Ellwood	Remodeled beyond recognition	9554 Hidden Valley Road, Beverly Hills	Plan	August 1954
17 [Ellwood]		Craig Ellwood	Remodeled beyond recognition	9554 Hidden Valley Road, Beverly Hills	Plan	September 1954
17 [Ellwood]		Craig Ellwood	Remodeled beyond recognition	9554 Hidden Valley Road, Beverly Hills	Plan	November 1954
17 [Ellwood]		Craig Ellwood	Remodeled beyond recognition	9554 Hidden Valley Road, Beverly Hills	Landscaping	March 1955
17 [Ellwood]		Craig Ellwood	Remodeled beyond recognition	9554 Hidden Valley Road, Beverly Hills	Plan, Merit Specifications	May 1955
17 [Ellwood]		Craig Ellwood	Remodeled beyond recognition	9554 Hidden Valley Road, Beverly Hills	Construction, Merit Specifications	June 1955
17 [Ellwood]		Craig Ellwood	Remodeled beyond recognition	9554 Hidden Valley Road, Beverly Hills	Construction, Merit Specifications	September 1955
17 [Ellwood]		Craig Ellwood	Remodeled beyond recognition	9554 Hidden Valley Road, Beverly Hills	Announcement	February 1956
17 [Ellwood]		Craig Ellwood	Remodeled beyond recognition	9554 Hidden Valley Road, Beverly Hills	Completion, Merit Specifications	March 1956
18 [Walker]	West House	Rodney Walker	Extant	199 Chautauqua Way, Pacific Palisades	Plan	November 1947
18 [Walker]	West House	Rodney Walker	Extant	199 Chautauqua Way, Pacific Palisades	Completion	February 1948
18 [Ellwood]	Fields House	Craig Ellwood	Demolished	1129 Miradero Rd Beverly Hills	Plan	February 1956
18 [Ellwood]	Fields House	Craig Ellwood	Demolished	1129 Miradero Rd Beverly Hills	Specifications	May 1956
18 [Ellwood]	Fields House	Craig Ellwood	Demolished	1129 Miradero Rd Beverly Hills	Plan	April 1957
18 [Ellwood]	Fields House	Craig Ellwood	Demolished	1129 Miradero Rd Beverly Hills	Plan	August 1957
18 [Ellwood]	Fields House	Craig Ellwood	Demolished	1129 Miradero Rd Beverly Hills	Merit Specifications	September 1957
18 [Ellwood]	Fields House	Craig Ellwood	Demolished	1129 Miradero Rd Beverly Hills	Merit Specifications	October 1957
18 [Ellwood]	Fields House	Craig Ellwood	Demolished	1129 Miradero Rd Beverly Hills	Construction	November 1957
18 [Ellwood]	Fields House	Craig Ellwood	Demolished	1129 Miradero Rd Beverly Hills	Landscape	February 1958
18 [Ellwood]	Fields House	Craig Ellwood	Demolished	1129 Miradero Rd Beverly Hills	Construction	March 1958
18 [Ellwood]	Fields House	Craig Ellwood	Demolished	1129 Miradero Rd Beverly Hills	Completion	May 1958
18 [Ellwood]	Fields House	Craig Ellwood	Demolished	1129 Miradero Rd Beverly Hills	Completion, Merit Specifications	June 1958
19		Don Knorr	Unbuilt		Plan	May 1957
19		Don Knorr	Unbuilt		Plan	August 1957
19		Don Knorr	Unbuilt		Plan	September 1957
19		Don Knorr	Unbuilt		Landscape	December 1957
19		Don Knorr	Unbuilt		Merit Specifications	October 1957
20 [Neutra]	Stuart Bailey House	Richard Neutra	Extant	219 Chautauqua Boulevard, Pacific Palisades	Plan	November 1947
20 [Neutra]	Stuart Bailey House	Richard Neutra	Extant	219 Chautauqua Boulevard, Pacific Palisades	Completion	December 1948
20 [Neutra]	Stuart Bailey House	Richard Neutra	Extant	219 Chautauqua Boulevard, Pacific Palisades	Construction	
20 [Buff, Straub, Hensman]	Bass House	C. Buff, C. Straub, D. Hensman	Extant	2275 North Santa Rosa Avenue, Altadena	Model	January 1958
20 [Buff, Straub, Hensman]	Bass House	C. Buff, C. Straub, D. Hensman	Extant	2275 North Santa Rosa Avenue, Altadena	Construction	July 1958
20 [Buff, Straub, Hensman]	Bass House	C. Buff, C. Straub, D. Hensman	Extant	2275 North Santa Rosa Avenue, Altadena	Construction	September 1958
20 [Buff, Straub, Hensman]	Bass House	C. Buff, C. Straub, D. Hensman	Extant	2275 North Santa Rosa Avenue, Altadena	Completion, Merit Specifications	November 1958
21 [Neutra]		Richard Neutra	Unbuilt		Plan	May 1947
21 [Koenig]	Walter Bailey House	Pierre Koenig	Extant	9038 Wonderland Park Avenue, Los Angeles	Plan	May 1958
21 [Koenig]	Walter Bailey House	Pierre Koenig	Extant	9038 Wonderland Park Avenue, Los Angeles	Construction	August 1958
21 [Koenig]	Walter Bailey House	Pierre Koenig	Extant	9038 Wonderland Park Avenue, Los Angeles	Construction	November 1958
21 [Koenig]	Walter Bailey House	Pierre Koenig	Extant	9038 Wonderland Park Avenue, Los Angeles	Completion	January 1959
21 [Koenig]	Walter Bailey House	Pierre Koenig	Extant	9038 Wonderland Park Avenue, Los Angeles	Completion	February 1959
1950		Raphael Soriano	Demolished	1080 Ravoli Dr, Pacific Palisades	Introduction	December 1949
1950		Raphael Soriano	Demolished	1080 Ravoli Dr, Pacific Palisades	Merit Specifications	February 1950
1950		Raphael Soriano	Demolished	1080 Ravoli Dr, Pacific Palisades	Merit Specifications	March 1950
1950		Raphael Soriano	Demolished	1080 Ravoli Dr, Pacific Palisades	Plan	April 1950
1950		Raphael Soriano	Demolished	1080 Ravoli Dr, Pacific Palisades	Merit Specifications	June 1950
1950		Raphael Soriano	Demolished	1080 Ravoli Dr, Pacific Palisades	Plan	August 1950
1950		Raphael Soriano	Demolished	1080 Ravoli Dr, Pacific Palisades	Construction	September 1950
1950		Raphael Soriano	Demolished	1080 Ravoli Dr, Pacific Palisades	Objects, Merit Speficiations	October 1950
1950		Raphael Soriano	Demolished	1080 Ravoli Dr, Pacific Palisades	Completion	November 1950
1950		Raphael Soriano	Demolished	1080 Ravoli Dr, Pacific Palisades	Completion, Merit Specifications	December 1950
22	Stahl House	Pierre Koenig	Extant	1635 Woods Drive, Los Angeles	Plan	May 1959
22	Stahl House	Pierre Koenig	Extant	1635 Woods Drive, Los Angeles	Construction	October 1959
22	Stahl House	Pierre Koenig	Extant	1635 Woods Drive, Los Angeles	Construction, Merit Specifications	February 1960
22	Stahl House	Pierre Koenig	Extant	1635 Woods Drive, Los Angeles	Completion, Merit Specifications	May 1960
22	Stahl House	Pierre Koenig	Extant	1635 Woods Drive, Los Angeles	Completion, Merit Specifications	June 1960
23A	Triad	Killingsworth, Brady, Smith & Assoc.	Extant	2342 Rue de Anne, La Jolla	Merit Specifications	September 1959
23A	Triad	Killingsworth, Brady, Smith & Assoc.	Extant	2342 Rue de Anne, La Jolla	Plan	October 1959
23A	Triad	Killingsworth, Brady, Smith & Assoc.	Extant	2342 Rue de Anne, La Jolla	Merit Specifications	December 1959
23A	Triad	Killingsworth, Brady, Smith & Assoc.	Extant	2342 Rue de Anne, La Jolla	Merit Specifications	January 1960
23A	Triad	Killingsworth, Brady, Smith & Assoc.	Extant	2342 Rue de Anne, La Jolla	Construction	April 1960
23A	Triad	Killingsworth, Brady, Smith & Assoc.	Extant	2342 Rue de Anne, La Jolla	Construction, Merit Specifications	July 1960
23A	Triad	Killingsworth, Brady, Smith & Assoc.	Extant	2342 Rue de Anne, La Jolla	Landscaping, Merit Specifications	August 1960
23A	Triad	Killingsworth, Brady, Smith & Assoc.	Extant	2342 Rue de Anne, La Jolla	Merit Specifications	September 1960
23A	Triad	Killingsworth, Brady, Smith & Assoc.	Extant	2342 Rue de Anne, La Jolla	Construction	October 1960
23A	Triad	Killingsworth, Brady, Smith & Assoc.	Extant	2342 Rue de Anne, La Jolla	Completion, Merit Specifications	March 1961
23B	Triad	Killingsworth, Brady, Smith & Assoc.	Remodeled beyond recognition	2343 Rue de Anne, La Jolla	Merit Specifications	September 1959
23B	Triad	Killingsworth, Brady, Smith & Assoc.	Remodeled beyond recognition	2343 Rue de Anne, La Jolla	Plan	October 1959
23B	Triad	Killingsworth, Brady, Smith & Assoc.	Remodeled beyond recognition	2343 Rue de Anne, La Jolla	Merit Specifications	December 1959
23B	Triad	Killingsworth, Brady, Smith & Assoc.	Remodeled beyond recognition	2343 Rue de Anne, La Jolla	Merit Specifications	January 1960
23B	Triad	Killingsworth, Brady, Smith & Assoc.	Remodeled beyond recognition	2343 Rue de Anne, La Jolla	Construction	April 1960
23B	Triad	Killingsworth, Brady, Smith & Assoc.	Remodeled beyond recognition	2343 Rue de Anne, La Jolla	Construction, Merit Specifications	July 1960
23B	Triad	Killingsworth, Brady, Smith & Assoc.	Remodeled beyond recognition	2343 Rue de Anne, La Jolla	Landscaping, Merit Specifications	August 1960
23B	Triad	Killingsworth, Brady, Smith & Assoc.	Remodeled beyond recognition	2343 Rue de Anne, La Jolla	Merit Specifications	September 1960
23B	Triad	Killingsworth, Brady, Smith & Assoc.	Remodeled beyond recognition	2343 Rue de Anne, La Jolla	Construction	October 1960
23B	Triad	Killingsworth, Brady, Smith & Assoc.	Remodeled beyond recognition	2343 Rue de Anne, La Jolla	Completion, Merit Specifications	March 1961
23C	Triad	Killingsworth, Brady, Smith & Assoc.	Extant	2329 Rue de Anne, La Jolla	Merit Specifications	September 1959
23C	Triad	Killingsworth, Brady, Smith & Assoc.	Extant	2329 Rue de Anne, La Jolla	Plan	October 1959
23C	Triad	Killingsworth, Brady, Smith & Assoc.	Extant	2329 Rue de Anne, La Jolla	Merit Specifications	December 1959
23C	Triad	Killingsworth, Brady, Smith & Assoc.	Extant	2329 Rue de Anne, La Jolla	Merit Specifications	January 1960
23C	Triad	Killingsworth, Brady, Smith & Assoc.	Extant	2329 Rue de Anne, La Jolla	Construction	April 1960
23C	Triad	Killingsworth, Brady, Smith & Assoc.	Extant	2329 Rue de Anne, La Jolla	Construction, Merit Specifications	July 1960
23C	Triad	Killingsworth, Brady, Smith & Assoc.	Extant	2329 Rue de Anne, La Jolla	Landscaping, Merit Specifications	August 1960
23C	Triad	Killingsworth, Brady, Smith & Assoc.	Extant	2329 Rue de Anne, La Jolla	Merit Specifications	September 1960
23C	Triad	Killingsworth, Brady, Smith & Assoc.	Extant	2329 Rue de Anne, La Jolla	Construction	October 1960
23C	Triad	Killingsworth, Brady, Smith & Assoc.	Extant	2329 Rue de Anne, La Jolla	Completion, Merit Specifications	March 1961
24	Eichler Homes	A. Quincy Jones and Frederick E. Emmons	Unbuilt		Plan	July 1961
24	Eichler Homes	A. Quincy Jones and Frederick E. Emmons	Unbuilt		Plan, Merit Specifications	September 1961
24	Eichler Homes	A. Quincy Jones and Frederick E. Emmons	Unbuilt		Model, Merit Specifications	December 1961
25	Frank House	Killingsworth, Brady, Smith & Associates	Extant	82 Rivo Alto Canal, Long Beach	Plan, Merit Specifications	January 1962
25	Frank House	Killingsworth, Brady, Smith & Associates	Extant	82 Rivo Alto Canal, Long Beach	Plan, Construction, Merit Specifications	March 1962
25	Frank House	Killingsworth, Brady, Smith & Associates	Extant	82 Rivo Alto Canal, Long Beach	Construction, Merit Specifications	May 1962
25	Frank House	Killingsworth, Brady, Smith & Associates	Extant	82 Rivo Alto Canal, Long Beach	Construction, Merit Specifications	August 1962
25	Frank House	Killingsworth, Brady, Smith & Associates	Extant	82 Rivo Alto Canal, Long Beach	Completion, Merit Specifications	May 1962
26	Harrison House	Beverley "David" Thorne	Extant	177 San Marino Drive, San Rafael	Plan, Construction, Merit Specifications	October 1962
26	Harrison House	Beverley "David" Thorne	Extant	177 San Marino Drive, San Rafael	Plan, Merit Specifications	November 1962
26	Harrison House	Beverley "David" Thorne	Extant	177 San Marino Drive, San Rafael	Completion, Merit Specifications	January 1963
26	Harrison House	Beverley "David" Thorne	Extant	177 San Marino Drive, San Rafael	Addition	July 1963
27		Campbell and Wong	Unbuilt		Plan	June 1963
28	Janss/Pacific Case Study House	C. Buff and D. Hensman	Extant	489 Oak Creek Drive, Thousand Oaks	Plan	July 1965
28	Janss/Pacific Case Study House	C. Buff and D. Hensman	Extant	489 Oak Creek Drive, Thousand Oaks	Model, Construction	December 1965
28	Janss/Pacific Case Study House	C. Buff and D. Hensman	Extant	489 Oak Creek Drive, Thousand Oaks	Completion	September 1966
Apt 1		Alfred N. Beadle, Alan A. Dailey	Extant	4402 N 28th St, Phoenix, AZ	Plan	November 1963
Apt 1		Alfred N. Beadle, Alan A. Dailey	Extant	4402 N 28th St, Phoenix, AZ	Completion	September 1964
Apt 2	Whitmore Apartments	Killingsworth, Brady, Smith & Assoc.	Unbuilt		Plan	May 1964
Apt 2	Whitmore Apartments	Killingsworth, Brady, Smith & Assoc.	Unbuilt		Merit Specifications	June 1964
Apt 2	Whitmore Apartments	Killingsworth, Brady, Smith & Assoc.	Unbuilt		Merit Specifications	July 1964
