= Case Study House No. 28 =

Historic house in Thousand Oaks, California

- U.S. National Register of Historic Places
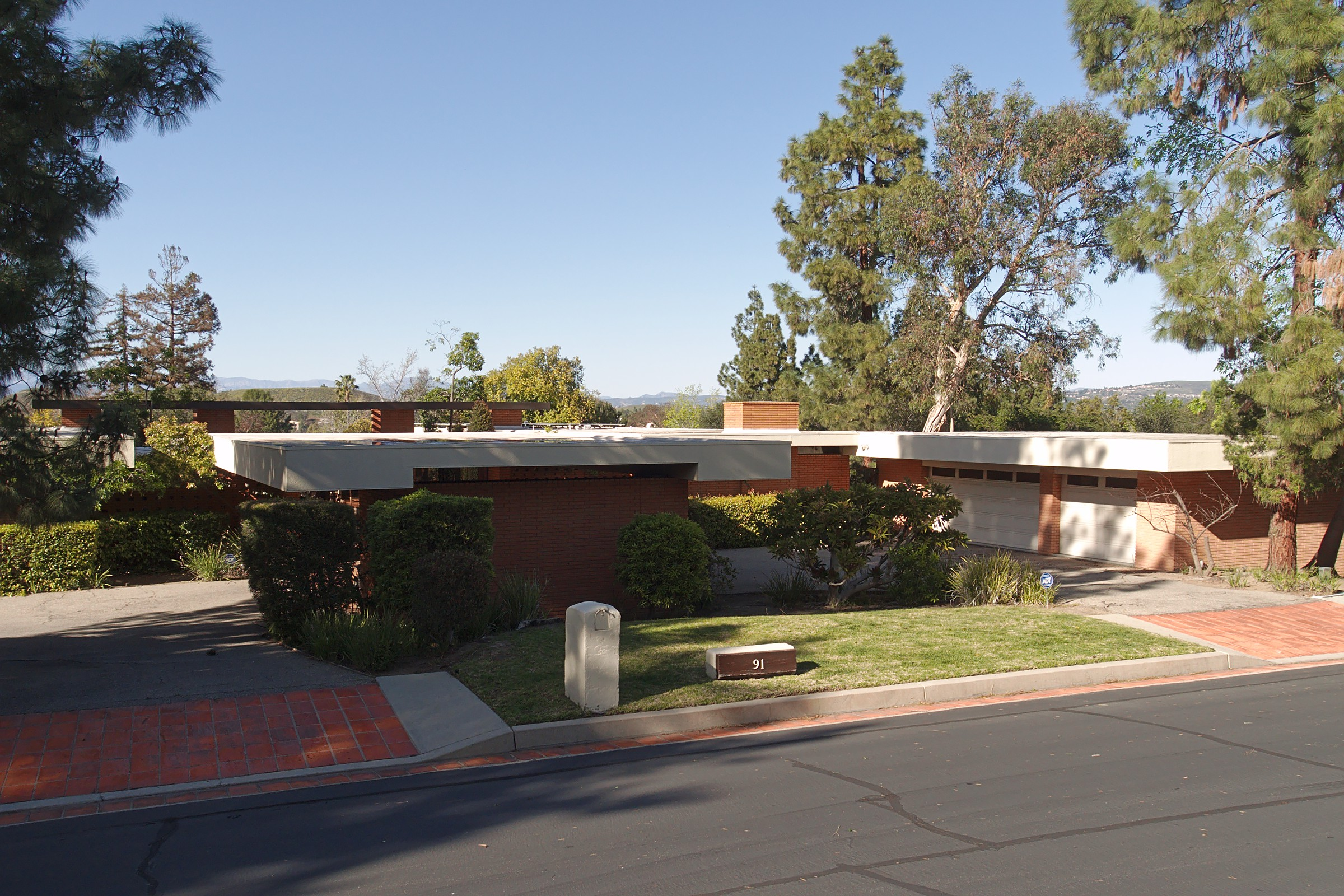

- Location within California Location within the United States
- Location: 91 Inverness Rd., Thousand Oaks, California
- Coordinates: 34°10′17″N 118°52′48″W
- Built: 1965-66
- Architectural style: Modern architecture
- NRHP reference No.: 13000522
- Added to NRHP: July 24, 2013

The Case Study House No. 28, at 91 Inverness Rd., Thousand Oaks, California, is the only Case Study House in Ventura County. Built during 1965–66, it was listed on the National Register on July 24, 2013. This one-story flat-roofed house, designed by architects Conrad Buff and Donald Hensman of the firm Buff and Hensman, was the last family home built in the program and one of the largest at 4,500 square feet. The architects designed the house with classic concept in modern architecture of merging interior and exterior spaces through glass expanses and seamless materials. Face brick was incorporated into the house since it is located on a knoll overlooking a development where this was the unifying material. Previous houses in the program consisted primarily of glass and exposed steel, but the Janss Development Corporation and Pacific Clay Products wanted to demonstrate the advantages of the alternative material.

Decorative iron gates at the entrance frame the center courtyard that has a swimming pool. Along with the brick face, the house has more than 4,000 square feet of glass windows that are shaded by overhangs. The owners described how they considered installing double paned glass but found it would not fit into the steel frame; the single paned glass makes the house hot in the summer and cold in the winter. Solar panels have been put on the roof along with replacing the asphalt and gravel material, popular at the time the house was constructed, with white foam.

When the current owners purchased the house in 1987, the previous owners had shared media coverage about the house with them. In 2013, the owner said, "I fell in love with the house. I saw it as a work of art."

== See also ==
- National Register of Historic Places listings in Ventura County, California
