= Charles Eames =

American designer, architect and film maker (1907–1978)

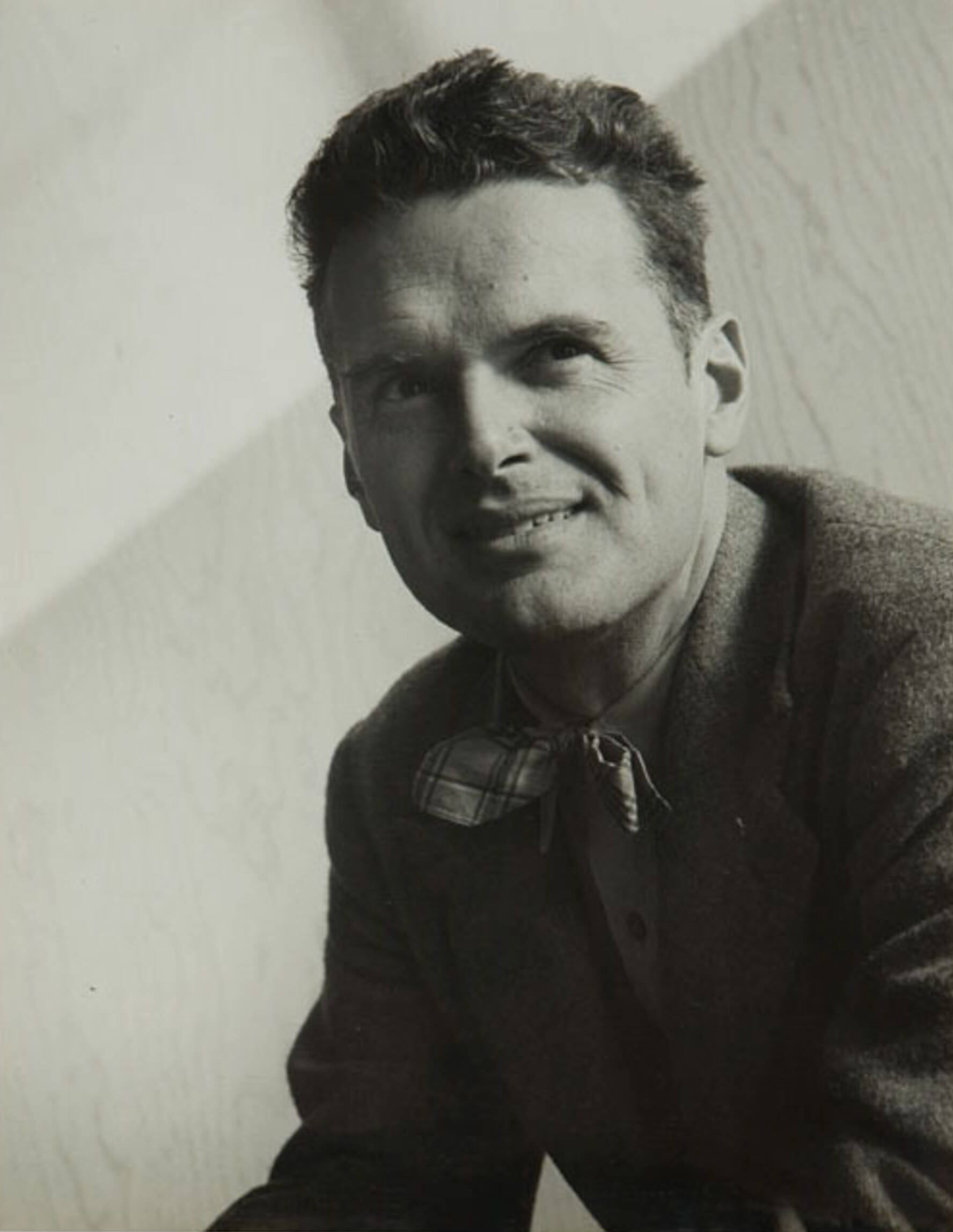
- Eames c. 1945
- Born: Charles Ormond Eames Jr. June 17, 1907; St. Louis, Missouri, U.S.
- Died: August 21, 1978 (aged 71); St. Louis, Missouri, U.S.
- Resting place: Calvary Cemetery
- Education: Washington University in St. Louis
- Occupations: Architect (unlicensed), designer, filmmaker
- Years active: 1930–1978
- Known for: Partnership with wife Ray Eames and the collective work of The Eames Office
- Notable work: Eames House
- Children: Lucia Dewey Eames

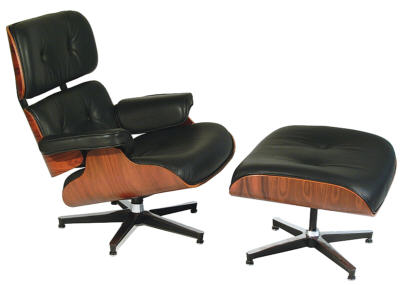
Lounge chair and ottoman by Eames (1955)

Charles Ormond Eames Jr. (June 17, 1907 – August 21, 1978) was an American designer, architect and filmmaker. In professional partnership with his wife Ray-Bernice Kaiser Eames, he made groundbreaking contributions in the fields of architecture, furniture design, industrial design, manufacturing and the photographic arts.

== Biography ==
=== Childhood ===
Charles was born in St. Louis, Missouri, to Charles Eames Sr., a railway security officer, and Marie Adele Celine Eames (née Lambert) on June 17, 1907. He had one elder sibling, a sister called Adele. Charles attended Yeatman High School and developed an early interest in architecture and photography.

=== Education ===
Eames studied architecture at the Sam Fox School of Design & Visual Arts at Washington University in St. Louis on an architecture scholarship. After two years of study, he left the university. Many sources claim that he was dismissed for his advocacy of Frank Lloyd Wright and his interest in modern architects. The university reportedly dropped him because of his "too modern" views. Other sources, less frequently cited, note that while a student, Charles Eames was also employed as an architect at the firm of Trueblood and Graf. The demands on his time from this employment and his classes may have led to sleep-deprivation and diminished performance at the university.

=== First marriage ===
While at Washington University, Eames met his first wife, Catherine Woermann, whom he married in 1929. A year later, they had a daughter, Lucia Dewey Eames. Charles and Catherine were divorced in early 1941.

=== Early architectural practice ===
In 1930, Eames began an architectural practice in St. Louis with partner Charles Gray. They were later joined by a third partner, Walter Pauley. Their buildings included:

- Sweetzer House, St. Louis, Missouri, 1931
- St. Mary's Church, Helena, Arkansas, 1934
- St. Mary's Catholic Church, Paragould, Arkansas, 1935
- Meyer House, Huntleigh, Missouri, 1936–1938
- Dinsmoor House, St. Louis, Missouri, 1936
- Dean House, St. Louis, Missouri, 1936

Eames was influenced by the Finnish architect Eliel Saarinen (whose son Eero, also an architect, would become a partner and friend).

=== Cranbrook and the beginning of furniture design ===
Eames rocking chair for Herman Miller, 1952

The Eames Lounge Chair Wood, 1945

At the elder Saarinen's invitation, Charles moved in 1938 with his wife Catherine and daughter Lucia to Michigan to further study architecture at the Cranbrook Academy of Art. Charles quickly became an instructor and the head of the industrial design department. In order to apply for the Architecture and Urban Planning Program, Eames defined an area of focus—the St. Louis waterfront. Together with Eero Saarinen he designed prize-winning furniture for New York's Museum of Modern Art "Organic Design in Home Furnishings" competition. He met Ray Kaiser during this project; she was a student at Cranbrook and helped with graphic design. Eames and Saarinen's work displayed the new technique of wood molding (originally developed by Alvar Aalto) that Charles would further develop with Ray in many molded plywood products, including chairs and other furniture, and splints and stretchers for the US Navy during World War II.

The long-running BBC television program Mastermind features an iconic black chair that was designed by Eames.

=== Ray Kaiser ===
In 1941, Charles and Catherine divorced, and soon afterwards, Eames married his Cranbrook Educational Community colleague Ray Kaiser. During their honeymoon, he relocated with her to Los Angeles, California, where they worked and lived together until their deaths. Together, Charles and Ray Eames internationally became two of the most recognized and celebrated designers of the 20th century.

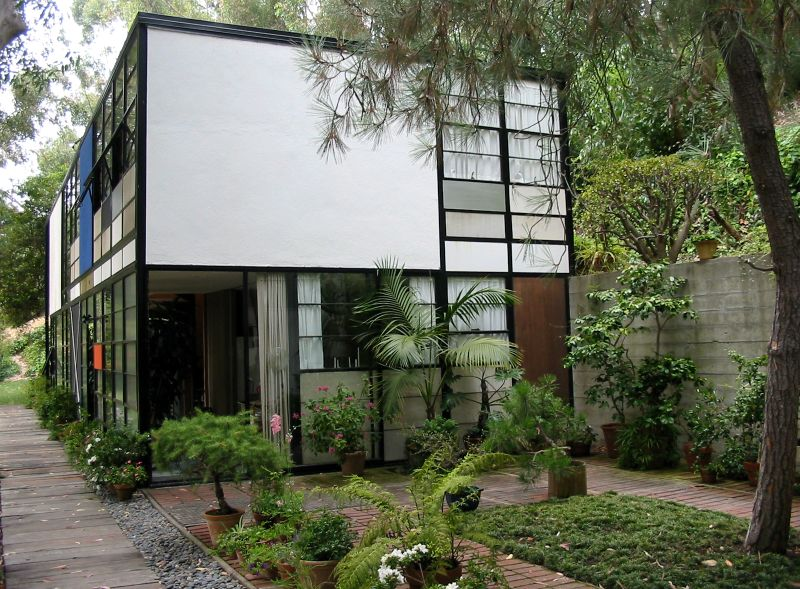
The Eames House (also known as Case Study House No. 8), constructed in 1949 in Pacific Palisades, California, by Charles and Ray Eames

== The Eames House ==
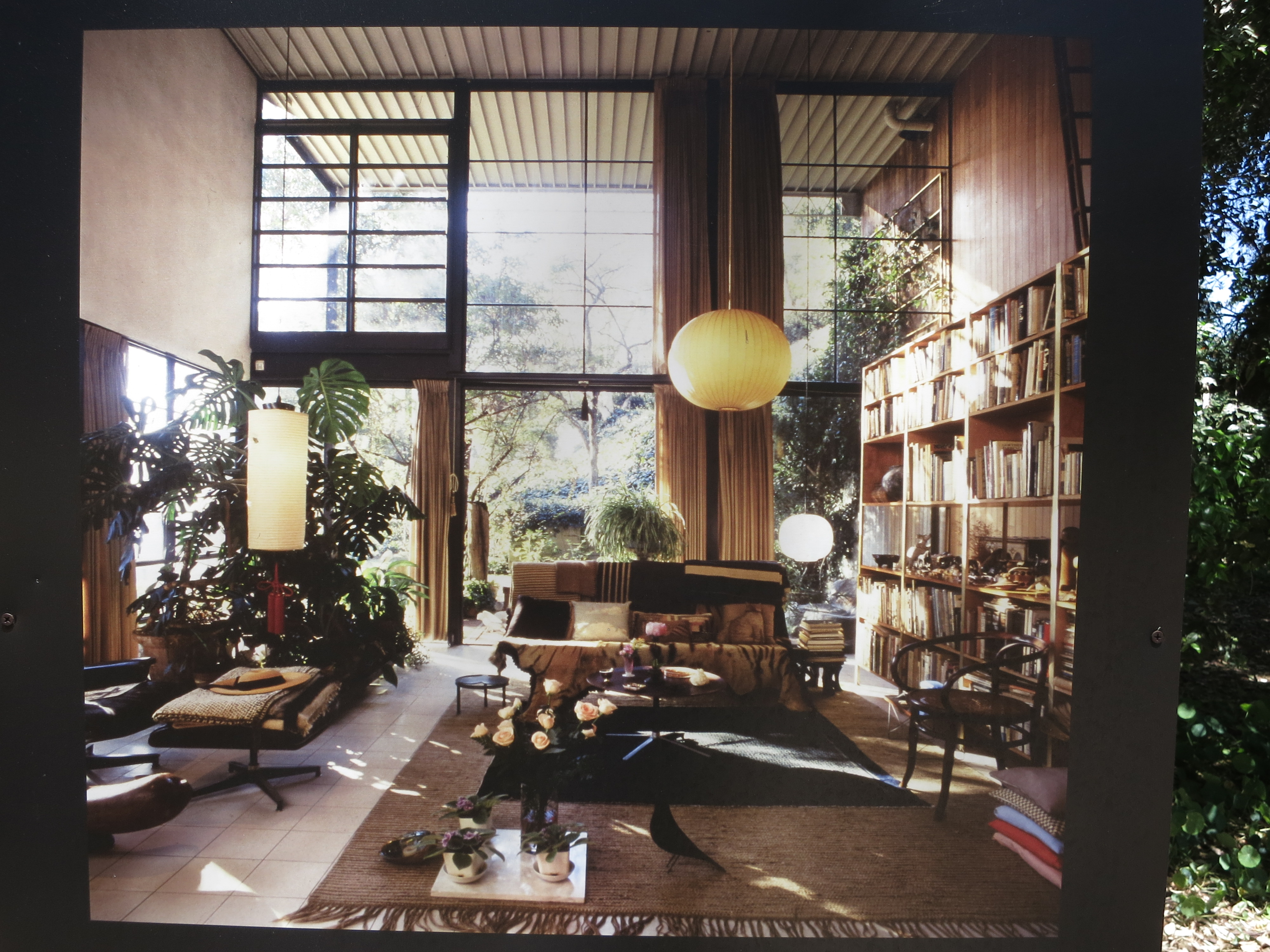
Eames House interior

Three years after arriving in Los Angeles, Charles and Ray were asked to participate in the Case Study House Program, a housing program sponsored by Arts & Architecture magazine in the hopes of showcasing examples of economically priced modern homes that used wartime and industrial materials. John Entenza, the owner and editor of Arts & Architecture, recognized the importance of Charles and Ray's thinking and design practices—alongside becoming a close friend of the couple. Charles and Eero Saarinen were hired to design Case Study House No. 8, which would be the residence of Charles and Ray, and Case Study House No. 9, which would house John Entenza, in 1945. The two homes (alongside other Case Study houses) would share a five-acre parcel of land in the Pacific Palisades neighborhood north of Santa Monica, which overlooked the Pacific Ocean. Because of post-war material rationing, the materials ordered for the first draft of the Eames House (called "the Bridge House") were backordered. Charles and Ray spent many days and nights on-site in the meadow picnicking, shooting arrows, and socializing with family, friends, and coworkers. They grew to love the eucalyptus grove, the expanse of land, and the unobstructed view of the ocean.

Eventually, they decided not to build the Bridge House, but instead reconfigured the materials to create two separate, glassy, block-like structures, nestled into the property’s hillside. Saarinen played no role in this second version of the house—instead, it became a collaboration between Charles and Ray. Once the materials arrived, in 1949, the buildings were erected in the period from February through December. The couple moved in on Christmas Eve, and the house became their sole residence for the rest of their lives. It remains a milestone of modern architecture.

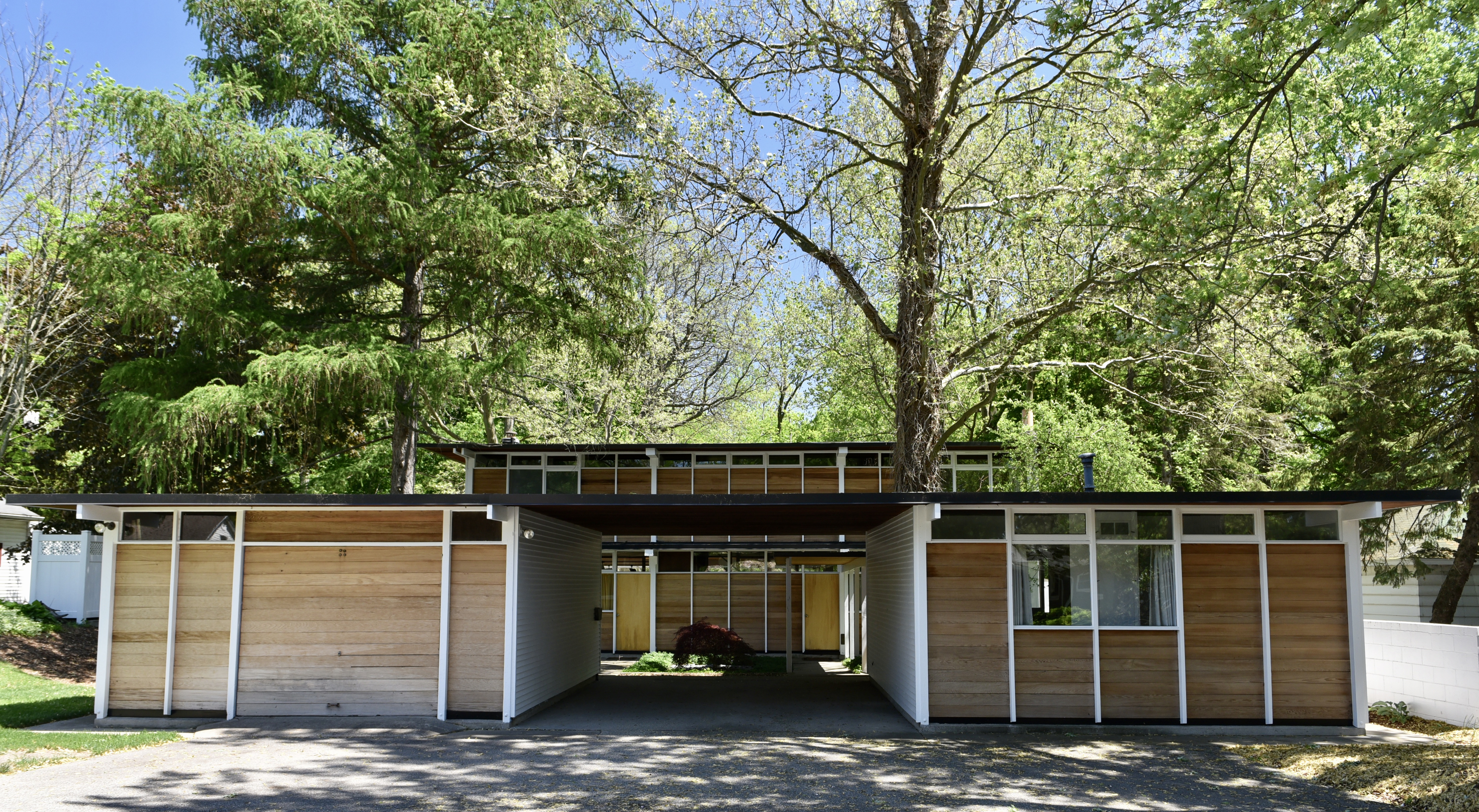
Max and Esther DePree House, Zeeland, Michigan

The Eames Office designed a few more pieces of architecture, many of which were never built. The Herman Miller Showroom on Beverly Boulevard in Los Angeles was built in 1950 and the De Pree House was constructed in Zeeland, Michigan for the founder of Herman Miller's son, Max De Pree, and his growing family. Unbuilt projects include the Billy Wilder House, the prefabricated kit home known as the Kwikset House, and a national aquarium.

== The Eames Office ==
From 1943 until his death in 1978, Charles and Ray worked together with a team of staff and produced an unparalleled breadth of creative design work across many disciplines.

== IBM and the 1964 World's Fair ==
With their interest in communicating ideas visually, the Eameses also turned their attention to exhibition design, beginning in 1950, for the Chicago Merchandise Mart and the New York Museum of Modern Art, and continuing into the mid-1970s, for IBM.

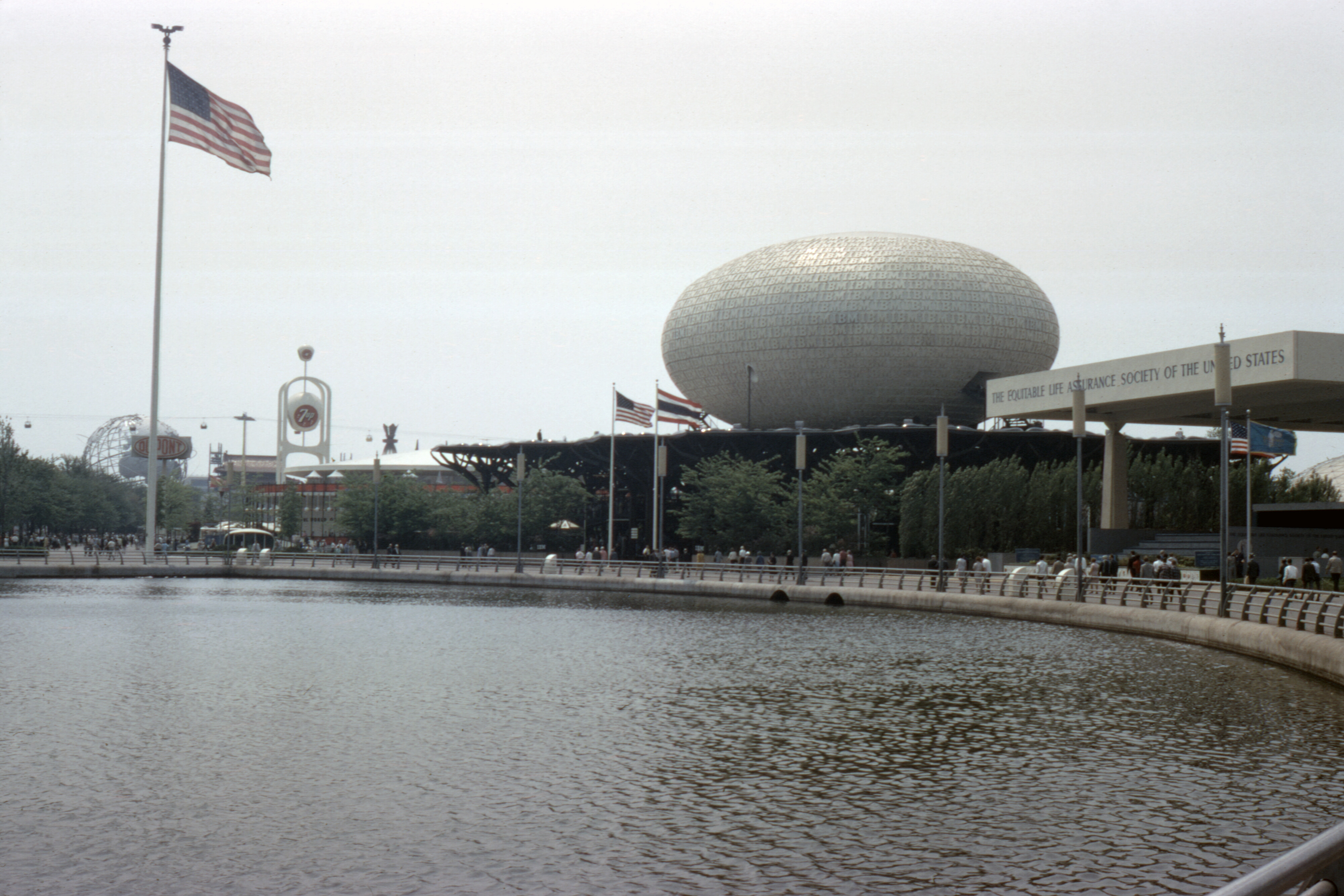
1964 World's Fair IBM Pavilion

As ongoing consultants to IBM, Charles and Ray developed a special relationship with the company that involved not only the creation of films, presentations, and educational products, but also Charles and Ray's insights for the future of the company.

During the 1960s and early 1970s, the Eameses designed a series of exhibitions for IBM, centered on scientific and mathematical themes, as well as famous individuals within those fields. If Ray was less passionate about computers than her husband, she shared his belief in their importance and used her talents to make them understandable and acceptable to ordinary people. In 1961, the IBM Corporation commissioned the Eameses to create Mathematica: A World of Numbers and Beyond, presenting mathematical concepts in a pleasurable way.

Mathematica's success gave the Eameses confidence to continue using exhibitions to explore complex themes, and the prestige it brought IBM led that corporation to commission a pavilion and an exhibition for the New York World's Fair of 1964. For this project, Charles and Ray immediately entered into discussions on this project with Eero Saarinen. The result was a 1.25-acre site divided into several distinct exhibition areas, each covered with an enormous translucent plastic canopy held up by steel "trees." Some designers and critics, considered it somewhat excessive and vulgar and felt that the Eameses had gone too far in their popularizing science, technology, and "the modern." The general public, however, appeared to have loved it.

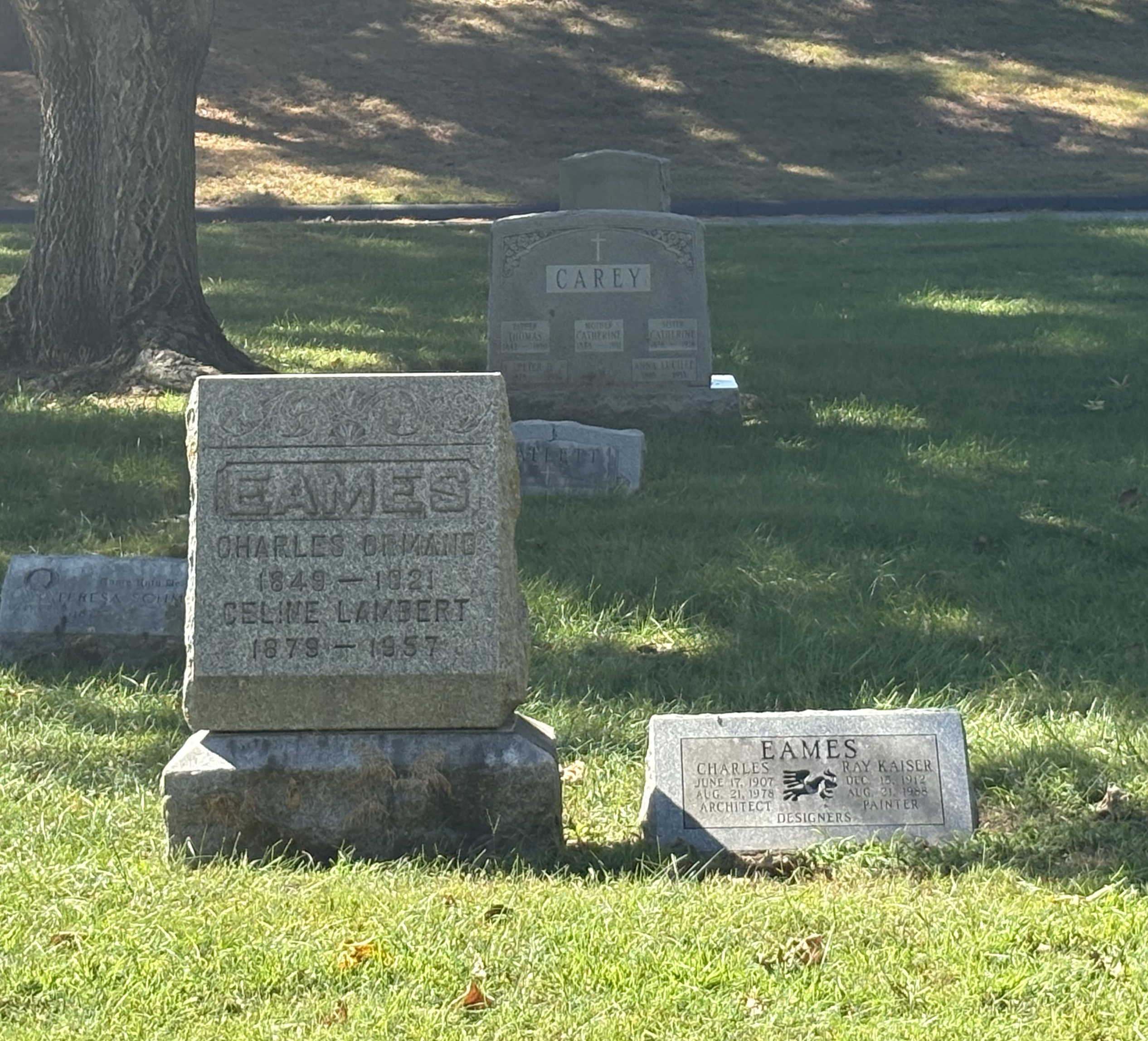
Graves of Charles and Ray Eames (smaller stone at right) at Calvary Cemetery, St. Louis, Missouri; the stone at left memorializes his parents

== Death ==
Charles Eames died of a heart attack on August 21, 1978, while on a consulting trip in his native Saint Louis. He was buried in the Calvary Cemetery in St. Louis. He now has a star on the St. Louis Walk of Fame.

== Philosophy ==
In 1970 and 1971, Charles Eames gave the Charles Eliot Norton Lectures at Harvard University. At the lectures, the Eames viewpoint and philosophy are related through Charles's telling of what he called "the banana leaf parable", a banana leaf being the most basic eating utensil in southern India. He related the progression of design and its process where the banana leaf is transformed into something fantastically ornate. He explains the next step and ties it to the design process by finishing the parable with:

But you can go beyond that and the guys that have not only means, but a certain amount of knowledge and understanding, go the next step and they eat off of a banana leaf. And I think that in these times when we fall back and regroup, that somehow or other, the banana leaf parable sort of got to get working there, because I'm not prepared to say that the banana leaf that one eats off of is the same as the other eats off of, but it's that process that has happened within the man that changes the banana leaf. And as we attack these problems—and I hope and I expect that the total amount of energy used in this world is going to go from high to medium to a little bit lower—the banana leaf idea might have a great part in it.

— Charles Eames

I think of myself officially as an architect; I look at the problems around us as problems of structure. The tools we use are often connected with the arts, but we use them to solve very specific problems ... I think of architects as tradesmen—and it doesn’t seem an unflattering idea. Anyone who calls himself an artist is suspect to me because an artist is a title you sort of earn, you don’t gain it by choosing a line of work.

— Charles Eames

In our chairs, we have not attempted to solve the problem of how people should sit. Instead, we accepted the way people do sit and operated within that framework.

— Charles Eames

The best preparation is a general education. I’ve never found a good mind that allowed techniques to stand in its way. By education I do not mean schooling—I mean the development of a sensitivity to the forces that give structure to life.

— Charles Eames

One of the things that seems to be common among those who tend to not be miserable is the ability to have concern [for], get pleasure from, and respect objects, people, and things that are of no immediate value to them. Respect for the thing that isn’t going to pay off tomorrow. Because tomorrow’s problems are going to be different, and the things that come to your rescue are often the things you learn to respect when you had no idea they were going to be of value.

— Charles Eames

I think the search for rewarding experience comes directly from the business of getting on with daily life. When we planned the IBM wall, we weren’t immediately worrying about communicating with the public. We were simply trying to understand the computer ourselves. I feel that if we can genuinely satisfy ourselves, we have a fair chance of reaching other people. Never for one moment did we think of the exhibition as a marriage of art and science; we always viewed it as part of life.

— Charles Eames
