= Entenza House =

Historic house in Los Angeles, California

- Location within the Los Angeles metropolitan area Location within California Location within the United States
- Alternative names: Case Study House No. 9

General information
- Location: 205 Chautauqua Boulevard, Pacific Palisades, Los Angeles, California, U.S.
- Coordinates: 34.03013°N 118.51882°W
- Completed: 1950

Design and construction
- Architects: Ray Eames, Charles Eames, and Eero Saarinen
- Designations

U.S. National Register of Historic Places
- Official name: Case Study House No. 9
- Designated: July 24, 2013
- Reference no.: 13000513

The Entenza House, also known as Case Study House No. 9, is a single family home at 205 Chautauqua Boulevard in Pacific Palisades, Los Angeles, California, United States. It was designed by industrial designer Charles Eames and architect Eero Saarinen for John Entenza as part of the Case Study House Program. The house was designed between 1945 and 1949 and construction was completed in 1950. Named accordingly, Entenza wanted to use the Case Study House #9 for himself as his private residence. He lived within the home for five years before selling it.

The Case Study Houses program was led by John Entenza in 1945 to 1966 . As the ninth house to be built for the Case Study Houses project, the Entenza House started construction in 1945 and was completed in 1949 in the Modern style, and later added to until 1962. The Entenza House was later added to the National Register of Historic Places in 2013.

== Case Study Houses ==
The house was built as part of the Case Study Houses program, announced in the January 1945 issue of Arts & Architecture magazine. The program, which ran until 1966, sought to develop inexpensive and efficient model homes to meet housing demand in the postwar United States. The first 13 Case Study houses were developed together in the 1940s, while the other houses were developed incrementally. These houses were built on private lots across Southern California, rather than at expositions or government-owned land as other demonstration houses had been, and were given a strict budget. The early Case Study houses tended to use wood, brick, concrete, and glass. Because the houses did not receive government subsidies, materials were either donated or, more commonly, bought at market value.

Charles Eames, who helped design Entenza's home, also designed the neighboring Eames House (Case Study House 8) for himself and his wife Ray. At the time, Eames and other designers were experimenting with open floor plans that included "multi-purpose rooms" dividing "public and private spaces" as a means to adapt to the new ways the home was being used for leisure purposes at the time. The Entenza and Eames houses are complementary in design; the Eames House is "described as a revealed vertical space," while the Entenza House is a "complementary concealed horizontal space". They are two of four residences designed on the same city block for the program. The other two are the West House (No. 18), and the Bailey House (No. 20).

== Landmark designation ==
The Entenza House, along with nine of the other remaining Case Study houses, were added to the National Register of Historic Places in 2013. The NRHP designation was for the house's representation of postwar residential housing and for the use of architectural features associated with the Case Study Houses program. The Entenza House was the first Case Study house to incorporate a steel frame, with the Eames House following suit.

== Layout and materials ==
Considered the new definition of the modern home, these homes featured construction using new materials and methods. The original floorplan of the home included "two bedrooms, a study, two bathrooms, kitchen, large open living/dining area, utility room and garage," and was completed in 1949. The Entenza House hosts a simplistic and flexible steel frame structure made of steel four-inch H-columns, supporting twelve-inch open web joists, that provide an open plan concept inside. To further the simplicity, the roof is a concrete slab with birch wood over the soffits. The use of the new glass and concrete materials provided by Libbey-Owens-Ford glass with Truscon steel window framing and Rocklite respectively, allowed for the undetectable transition between indoors and outdoors throughout the space. These new materials were chosen for their ability to lower the cost of maintenance, heating, and lighting, as well as their ability to expand the usable space of a home for comfortable living.

On the same lot as four other Case Study Houses, the shared narrow driveway was later changed in the 1990s "to accommodate a much larger residence on the ocean side of the property". The only remaining part of the house left untouched from the original design and construction is the ocean-side portion of the home.

The floor plan was designed to reflect Entenza's desire for a home that facilitates conversation and entertainment. The floor plan includes a large open living room that spans 36 feet in length. In order to create a public gathering space in the home that was readily adaptable to any sized party, the living room was made as an open plan concept, with a large fireplace separating a smaller and larger portion of the living room. Adjacent to the living room is the dining room, a kitchen, two bedrooms, two bathrooms, and a study. The part of the house oriented to the ocean houses the large public space, connected by a covered hallway to the rest of the house.

The interior of the Entenza house materials consists of "plastered and wood-paneled surfaces". The part of the house facing the ocean houses the large public space, connected by a covered hallway to the rest of the house. Despite the desire to showcase new technologies of Modern design with the new materials previously stated, the Entenza house covered up most of the steel-framing with wood-paneled cladding on the interior.

== See also ==
- National Register of Historic Places listings in Los Angeles

== Sources ==
- Filler, Martin (October 1, 1997). "Reopening the Case". House Beautiful. Vol. 139, no. 10. pp. 152–157. ProQuest 2804935893.
- Kirkham, Pat (1998). Charles and Ray Eames : designers of the twentieth century. MIT Press. ISBN 978-0-262-61139-8.
- McCoy, Esther (1977). Case Study Houses, 1945-1962. Hennessey & Ingalls. ISBN 978-0-912158-70-9.
- Neuhart, Marilyn; Neuhart, John (May 25, 1994). Eames House. Wiley. ISBN 978-3-433-02428-7.
- Pelkonen, Eeva-Liisa; Albrecht, Donald, eds. (2006). Eero Saarinen: Shaping the Future. Yale University Press. ISBN 978-0-300-12237-4.
