= John Entenza =

American magazine editor (1905–1984)

- Born: John Dymock Entenza; December 4, 1905; Calumet, Michigan, United States
- Died: April 27, 1984 (aged 78); La Jolla, California, United States
- Title: Editor-in-chief of Arts & Architecture
- Term: 1938–1962
- Predecessor: Mark Daniels
- Successor: David Travers
- Awards: Distinguished Service citation from the American Institute of Architects

John Entenza (December 4, 1905 – April 27, 1984) was an American magazine editor who was the editor-in-chief of Arts & Architecture magazine from 1938 to 1962. He was one of the pivotal figures in the growth of American modernism: in the fields of environmental, architectural, landscape, and product design; and fine arts, and artisan crafts; in post-war California and the United States. Under his tenure at Arts & Architecture, the magazine sponsored the Case Study Houses program of experimental houses in southern California.

== Career ==
In 1940, John Entenza joined California Arts and Architecture magazine as editor. By 1943, he had completely overhauled the magazine and renamed it Arts & Architecture Magazine. During his editorship, Arts & Architecture Magazine championed all that was new in the arts, with special emphasis on emerging modernist architecture in Southern California. He made it the first American magazine to popularize the work of Hans Hofmann, Craig Ellwood, Margaret DePatta, George Nakashima, Bernard Rosenthal, Charles Eames, Konrad Wachsmann, Jan De Swart and many others. Entenza served as director of the Graham Foundation for Advanced Studies in the Fine Arts in Chicago from 1960 until his retirement in 1971. He received a Distinguished Service citation from the American Institute of Architects. He also served as a trustee of the Amon Carter Museum of American Art.

Entenza died of cancer in La Jolla, California at the age of 78.

== Case Study Houses ==
Entenza's most lasting contribution was his sponsorship of the Case Study Houses project, which featured the works of architects such as Raphael Soriano, Charles Eames, Craig Ellwood, Pierre Koenig, A. Quincy Jones, Richard Neutra, Eero Saarinen, Rodney Walker and William Wurster. Arts & Architecture also ran articles and interviews on artists and designers such as Jackson Pollock, Robert Motherwell, George Nakashima, George Nelson, and many other ground-breakers.

He lived in one of the Case Study Houses, No. 9 (the Entenza House), designed by Saarinen and Eames.
