= Arts & Architecture =

American periodical (1929–1967)

Arts & Architecture (1929–1967) was an American design, architecture, landscape, and arts magazine. It was published and edited by John Entenza from 1938 to 1962 and David Travers 1962–1967. Arts & Architecture played a significant role both in Los Angeles's cultural history and in the development of West Coast modernism in general. The magazine's significant cultural contributions include its sponsorship of the Case Study Houses design-build-publication program.

== History ==
Arts & Architecture (1940–1967), an American architecture magazine, began as California Arts & Architecture in 1929. It was redesigned under the leadership of Mark Daniels in 1936, and in 1940, John Entenza became publisher and editor; his views and leadership "put California on the cultural map", creating a lasting impact on the cultural history of Los Angeles, Southern California, the West Coast, and the United States in the development of American modernism. According to American Design in the Twentieth Century, Arts & Architecture "treated taste as a subject of critical debate and maintained a high-minded concern for the elevation of standards". When looking for examples of overseas art and design, the magazine looked to Mexico rather than Europe. In 1962 Entenza resigned to direct the Graham Foundation, and the magazine was edited by David Travers until its closing in 1967. It was revived 1981-1985 under the editorship of Barbara Goldstein.

== Designers published ==
Arts & Architecture was the first American magazine to popularize the work of Pierre Koenig, Hans Hofmann, Craig Ellwood, Raphael Soriano, Margaret DePatta, George Nakashima, Bernard Rosenthal, Charles Eames, Ray Eames, Thomas Church, Garrett Eckbo, Lloyd Wright, Konrad Wachsmann, Robert Royston, Hans Hollein, Frank Gehry and many others. It also embodied the highest standard of graphic design attained by an American art magazine of its time, employing the talents of such designers as Alvin Lustig, Herbert Matter, John Follis, and photographer Julius Shulman. The magazine featured articles by writers such as architectural historian Esther McCoy, Edgar Kaufmann, Jr., Walter Gropius, Lewis Mumford and many more that were deeply involved in the modern movement.

== Reprints ==
Book publisher Taschen has published a facsimile of all issues of the monthly magazine from 1945 to 1954 with an introduction by David Travers. Publication of issues 1955 to 1967 is planned.

== See also ==
- Case Study Houses
- List of defunct American periodicals
- Modernism
