= Zoppio =

Zoppio is an Italian surname. Notable people with the surname include:

- Girolamo Zoppio (date unknown - 1591), 16th-century Bolognese writer
- Melchiorre Zoppio (c. 1544–1634), Italian doctor and scholar

== See also ==
- Zoppi
- Zoppo
