= Delzoppo =

Delzoppo or Del Zoppo is an Italian surname. Notable people with the surname include:

- Annette Del Zoppo (1936–2001), American photographer
- John Delzoppo (born 1931), Australian politician

== See also ==
- Zoppo
