= Eames Fiberglass Armchair =

Chair designed by Charles and Ray Eames

Eames Molded Plastic & Fiberglass Armchair
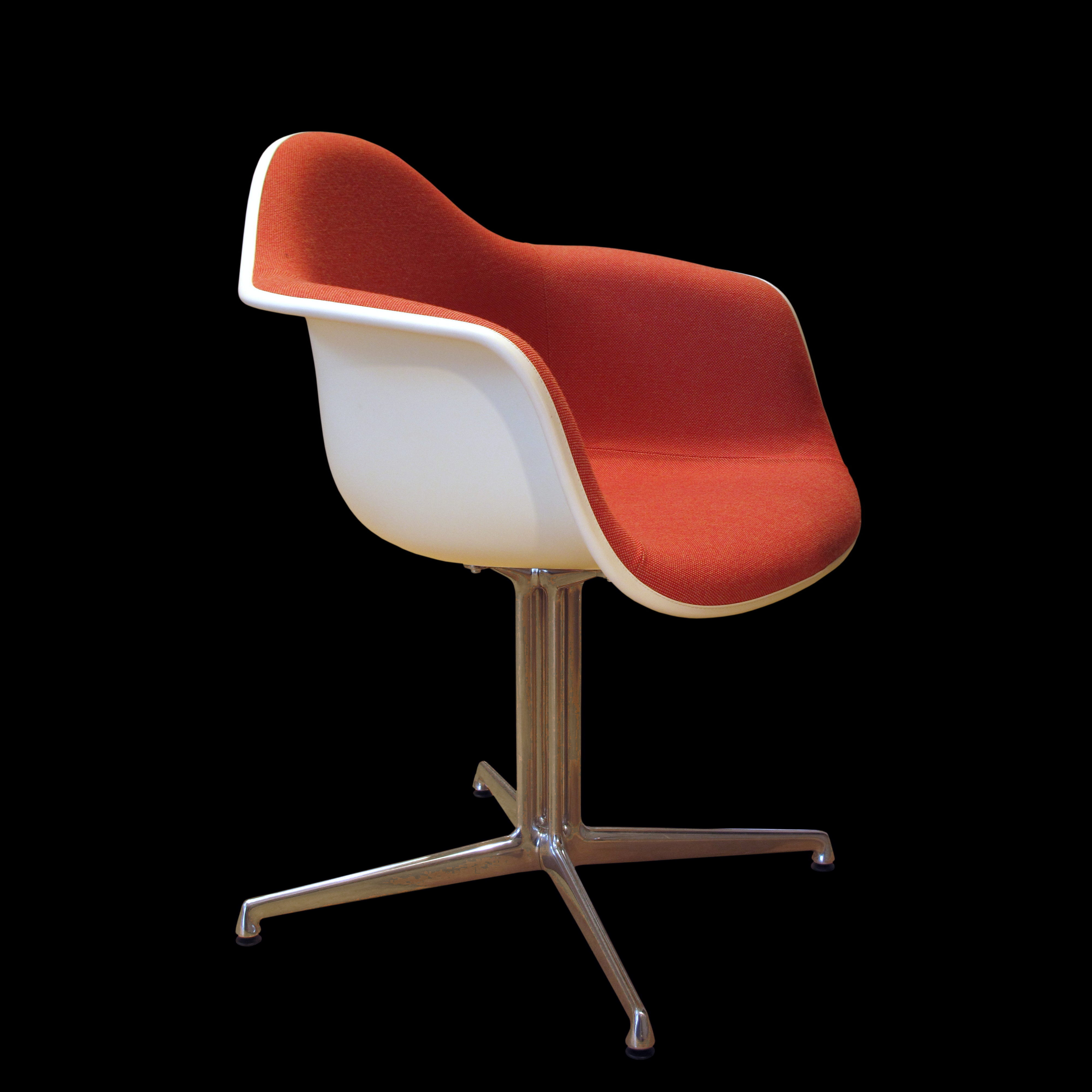
- The Armchair, with central aluminium stand (DAL)
- Designer: Charles and Ray Eames
- Date: 1948–1950
- Materials: Zenaloy (polyester reinforced with fiberglass)
- Style / tradition: Mid-century modern furniture design
- Sold by: Herman Miller (United States); Vitra (Switzerland)

The Eames Molded Plastic & Fiberglass Armchair is a fiberglass chair designed by Charles and Ray Eames of the Eames Office, which appeared on the market in 1950. The chair was intentionally designed for the International Competition for Low-Cost Furniture Design. This competition, sponsored by the Museum of Modern Art, was motivated by the urgent need in the post-war period for low-cost housing and furnishing designs adaptable to small housing units.

The chair was available in a variety of colors and bases, including the "Eiffel Tower" metal base, a wooden base, and a rocker base. The plastic fiberglass armchair is one of the most iconic designs by Charles and Ray Eames, and remains popular today.

== Designing with plastic ==
"Getting the most of the best to the greatest number of people for the least": with these words, Charles and Ray Eames described one of their main goals as furniture designers. Of all their designs, the Plastic Chairs come closest to achieving this ideal. They found that the use of plastic in furniture design has several advantages: it has pleasant tactile qualities, it has malleability and static strength combined with a high degree of flexibility, and it makes feasible, via mass-production, their goal of low-cost furniture.

== Production ==
=== The early production of the chair ===
The material of the chair, Zenaloy, which is polyester reinforced with fiberglass, was first developed by the US Army during World War II. Using this material, Ray and Charles Eames designed a prototype chair for the 1948 'International Competition of Low-Cost Furniture Design' held by the Museum of Modern Art. The chairs were made using the latest machines, such as hydraulic press molds from shipbuilding, by manufacturer Zenith Plastics. Mass-producing the molded fiberglass chairs involved a tremendous amount of design and tooling effort, a long period of product development, and considerable investment. The basic technology involved shaping the fiberglass material with metal molds using a hydraulic press. The armchair was the first one-piece plastic chair whose surface was left uncovered and not upholstered. In 1950, Zenith began mass-producing the fiberglass shell armchairs for Herman Miller, who offered them for sale that year. The fiberglass armchair was included in the collection of the Museum of Modern Art in 1950.

=== Production in Europe ===
The Vitra company entered the furniture market in 1957 with the licensed production of furniture from the Herman Miller Collection for the European market. In 1984, the partnership formed with Herman Miller was terminated by mutual consent. Subsequently, Vitra obtained the European and Middle Eastern rights to designs by Charles and Ray Eames and George Nelson.

== Variety of forms ==
At first, the chair was available in three colors: greige, elephant-hide gray, and parchment. The palette of colors was later expanded. After that, a choice of several possible bases was offered.

The early "H" metal base (the SAX standard model and the LAX lounge lower model), "X" metal base (the DAX dining model), a lower model with metal rod base (the LAR model), a wooden base (the DSW model), a steel-wire base (the DSR model, also known as the "Eiffel-Tower base"), a cast aluminium base with castors (the PACC model), and a wood-rocker base (the RAR model). All of the bases were attached to the seat using hard rubber disks to allow flexibility.

Herman Miller ceased production of the rocker in 1968, and then reintroduced it 30 years later. Even while discontinued, "pregnant employees continued to receive these chairs as a company gift until 1984, solidifying the rocker as a symbol of high-end nursery decor." The plastic shell became available in an upholstered (fabric or vinyl) version a year after the introduction of the chair. After the success of the armchair, the side chair (without arms) was introduced (in the DSW, DSX, and DSR models). Over the years, the plastic chair has undergone some modifications: the curve of the back has become more inclined, and upholstery is now glued to the plastic shell.

The Eames plastic armchair immediately became an iconic design, and it was eventually used in schools, airports, restaurants, and offices around the world. From 1954, the chairs were used as stadium seating, with metal rods arranged in rows to form the Tandem Shell Seating.

=== Naming convention ===
- DAL = Dining (height) Armchair (arms) La Fonda (base)
- DAR = Dining (height) Armchair (arms) Rod (base)
- DAW = Dining (height) Armchair (arms) Wood (base)
- DAX = Dining (height) Armchair (arms) X-Base (base)
- DAG = Dining (height) Armchair (arms) Wall Guard (base)
- DAT = Desk (height) Armchair (arms) Tilt (base)
- MAX = Medium (height) Armchair (arms) X-Base (base)
- SAX = Small (height) Armchair (arms) X-Base (base)
- RAR = Rocker (height) Armchair (arms) Rod (base)
- PAW = Pivot (pivoting) Armchair (arms) Wood (base)
- PAC = Pivot (pivoting) Armchair (arms) Contract (base)
- LAR = Low (height) Armchair (arms) Rod (base)
- LAX = Low (height) Armchair (arms) X-Base (base)
Variants

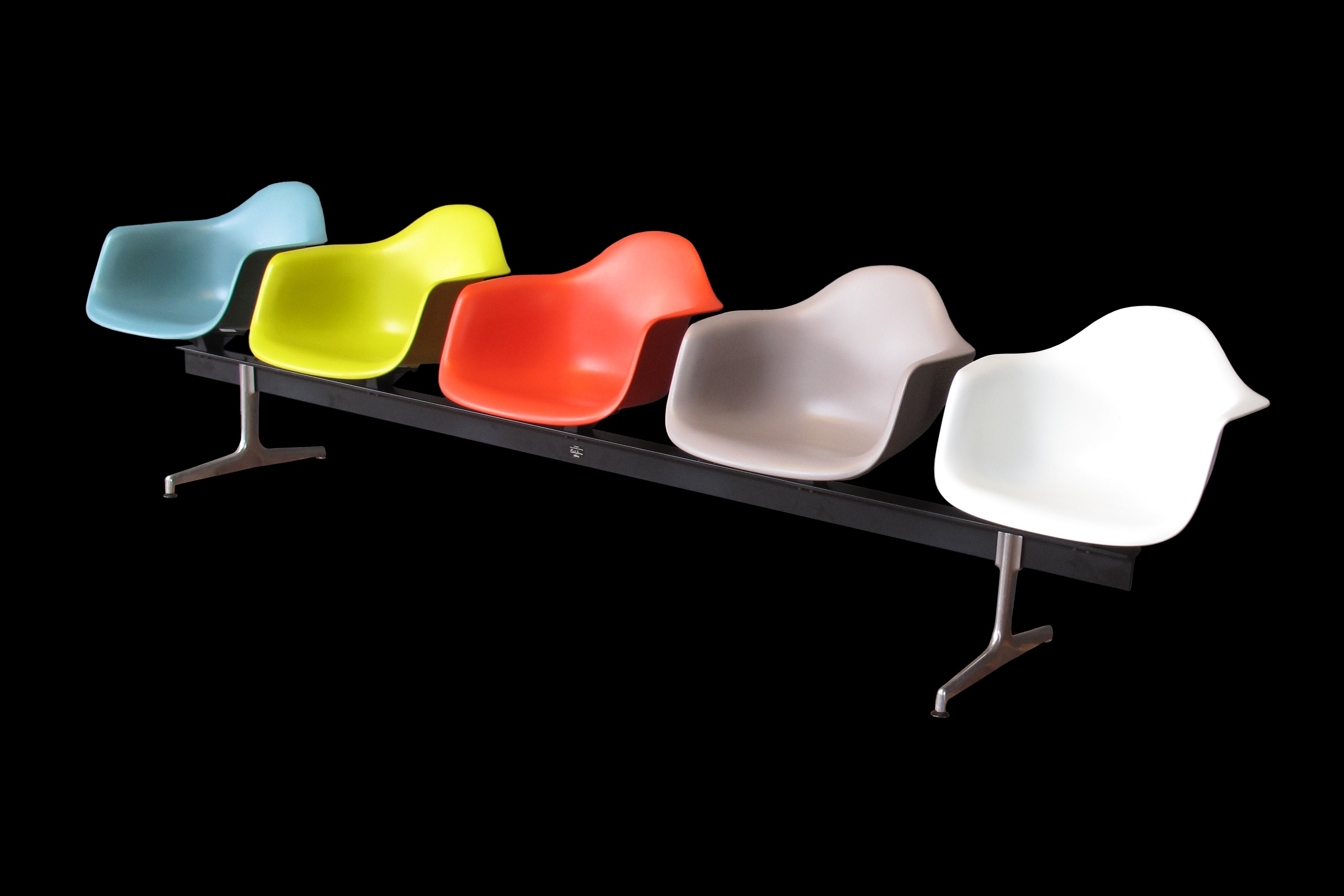
Bench variant, with various shell colours

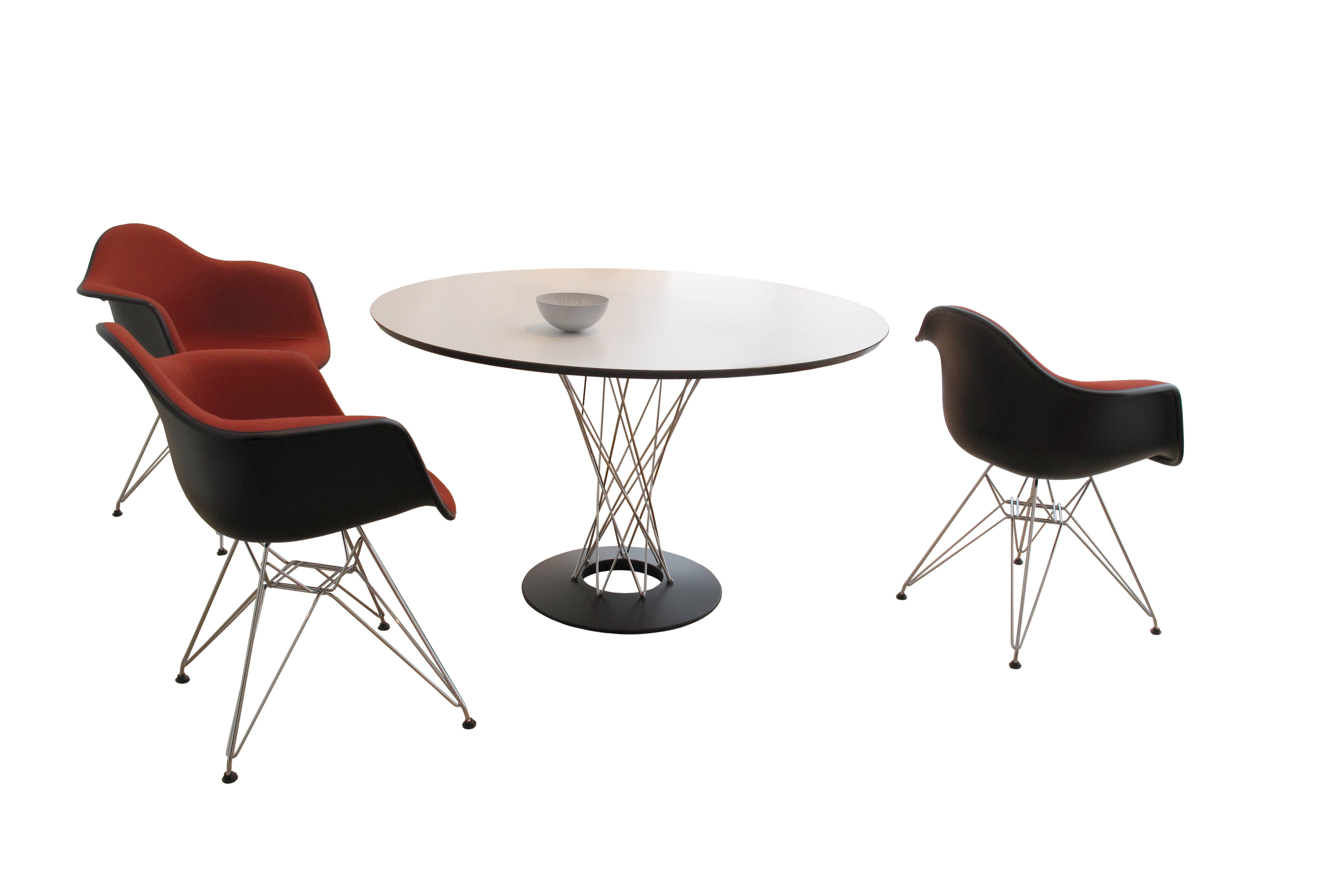
DSR "Eiffel-Tower base" model with upholstery

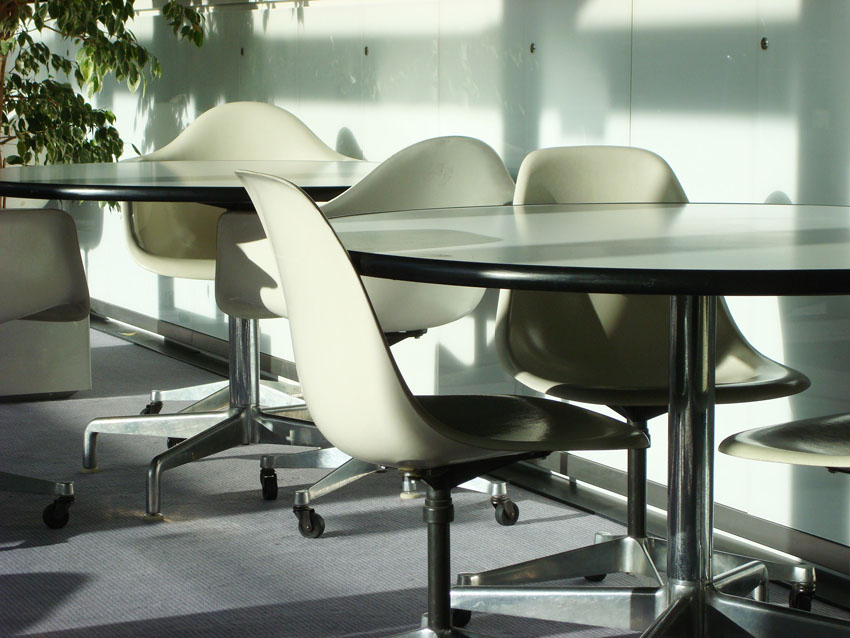
The PACC configuration, showing both chairs and armchairs

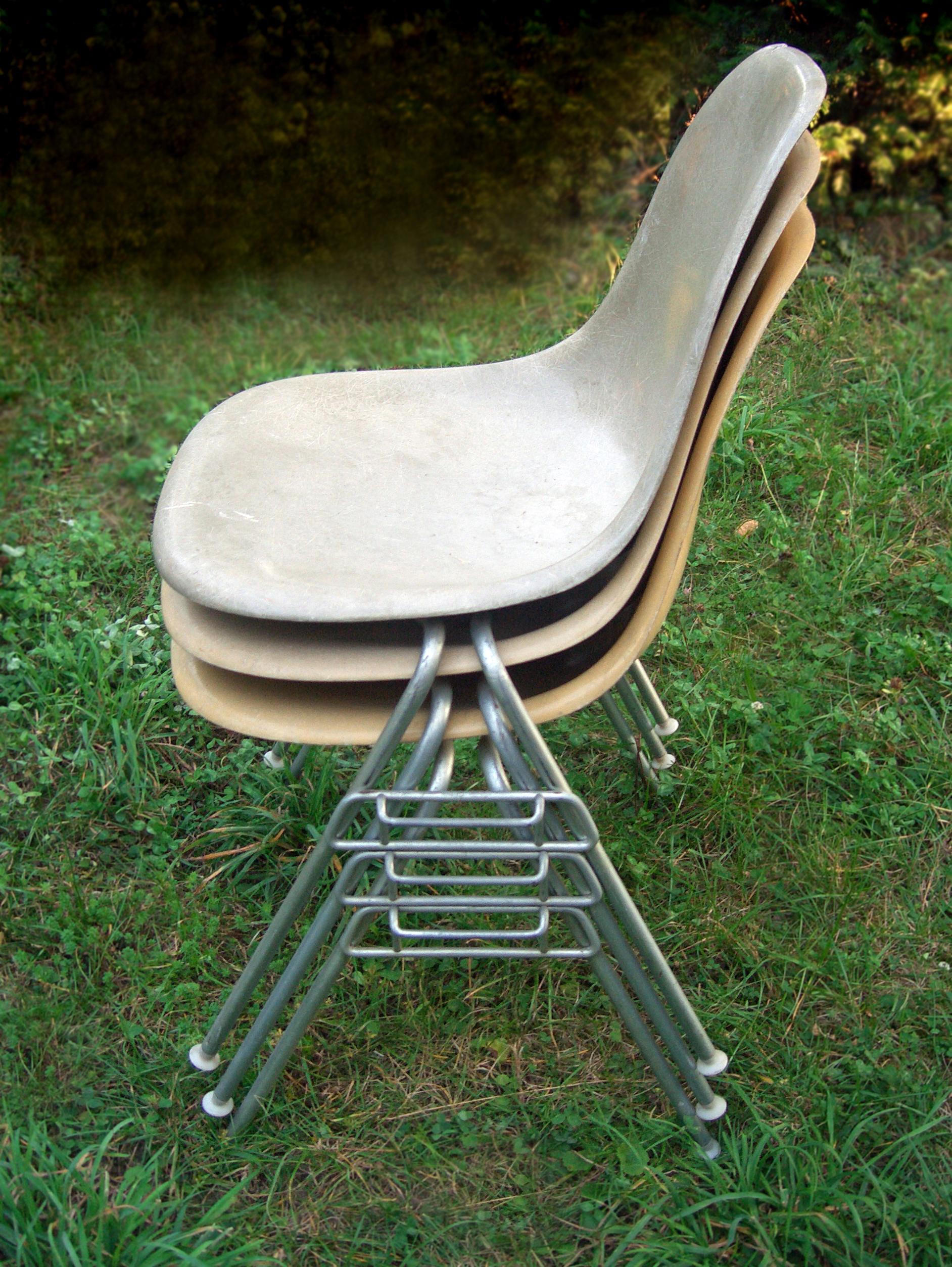
The stackable DSS chair

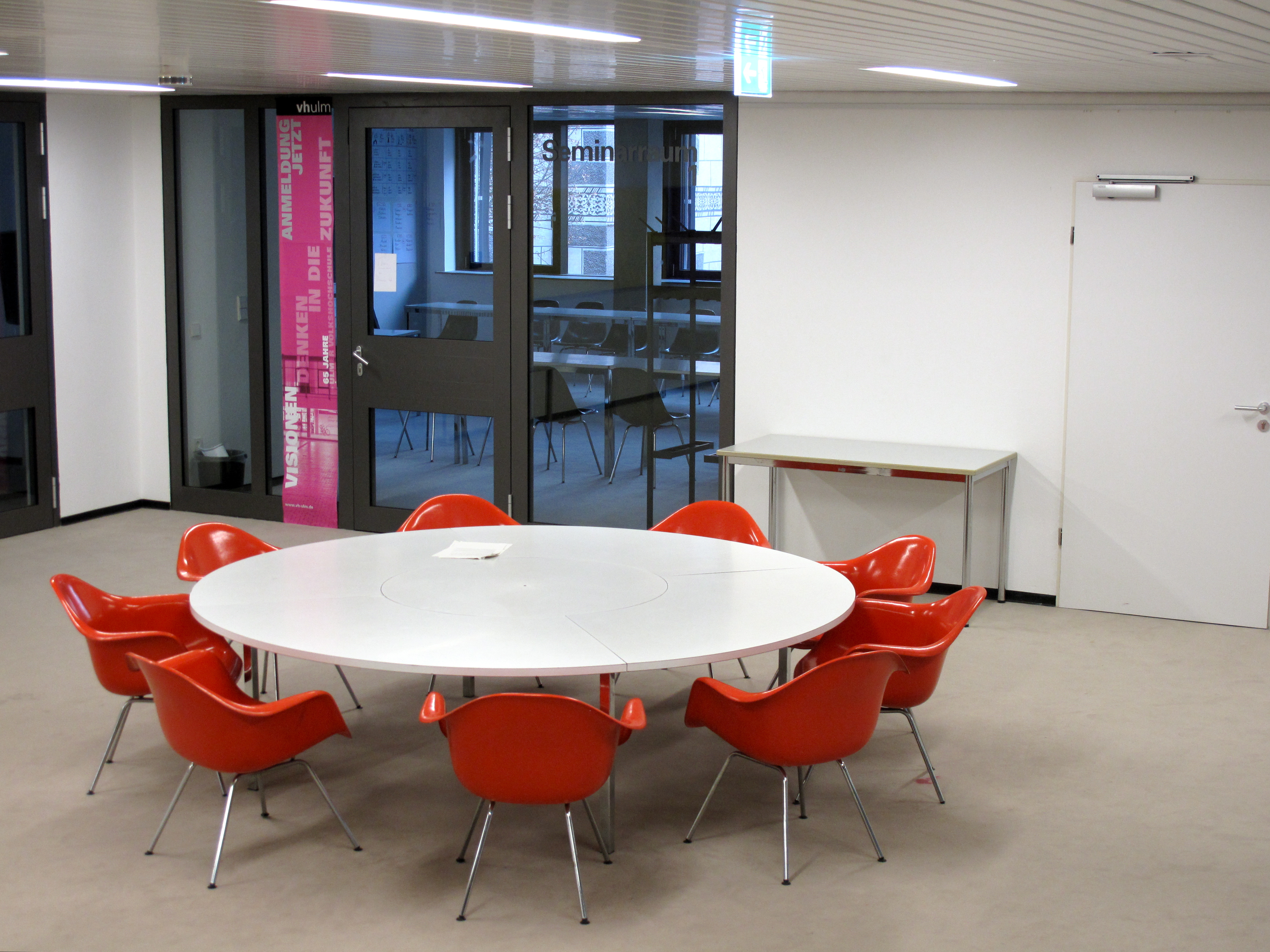
The DAX dining version

== Current production ==
The chairs are still in production by Herman Miller and Vitra. However, each producer uses different material for their chair. In 1993, Vitra discontinued production of the fiberglass shells for ecological reasons. The company resumed manufacture of the shells in 1989 and 2004, respectively, making them available in polypropylene, a more environmentally friendly material. Also, Herman Miller uses the polypropylene material for their production of the chairs. The production process for the new fiberglass chairs by both manufacturers is now emission-free and uses a new, monomer-free resin which creates a safer environment for workers and a more environmentally friendly, recyclable shell.

The chairs are still available and, after more than seventy years, are commonly used by interior designers and featured in magazines.

== See also ==
- Chaise longue
- Eames Lounge Chair Wood
- Eames Lounge Chair
