= Ercole Bottrigari =

Italian composer

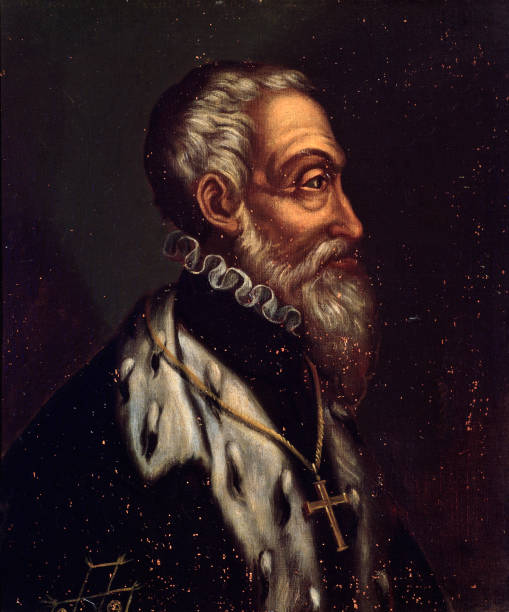
- Born: 24 August 1531; Bologna, Papal States
- Died: 30 September 1612 (aged 81); San Pietro in Casale, Papal States
- Resting place: San Francesco
- Occupation: Composer; music theorist; Renaissance humanist
- Spouse(s): Lucrezia Usberti (m. 1551; died 1591)

Ercole Bottrigari (24 August 1531 – 30 September 1612 ) was an Italian scholar, mathematician, poet, music theorist, architect, and composer.

== Life ==
The illegitimate son of Giovanni Battista Bottrigari, a wealthy Bolognese aristocrat, and Cornelia (alias Caterina) de' Chiari of Brescia, he was legitimized on 16 August 1538 and then raised in his father's house at Sant’Alberto, near Bologna. On 7 March 1542 Bottrigari was selected by the Bolognese senate as one of a group of 12 young aristocrats deputed to welcome the new Cardinal Legate, Gasparo Contarini, to the city. Evidently Bottrigari distinguished himself in the recitation of poetry and orations on this occasion; he was duly rewarded by Contarini who invested him with the titles of Knight of the Holy See and Lateran during a Pontifical High Mass in Bologna Cathedral on 9 April 1542. As a young man he studied classical languages with Francesco Lucchino of Trento, perspective and architecture with Giacomo Ranuzzi and mathematical sciences with Nicolò Simo, professor of astronomy at the University of Bologna. Bottrigari also studied music with Bartolomeo Spontone with whom he remained in close contact for many years; their friendship is acknowledged by Spontone in the dedications to both his Il primo libro di madrigali a quattro voci (Venice, 1558), and Libro terzo de madrigali a cinque voci (Venice, 1583). In 1546 Bottrigari, supported by his father, established a private press in the centre of Bologna, probably modelled on the ‘Tipografia bocchiana’ loosely connected to the Accademia Hermatena. Just nine editions are known to have been printed there, all quite short and in small formats; their extreme scarcity probably reflects short press-runs. In May or June 1551 Bottrigari began his political career when he was elected a member of the Consiglio degli Anziani in Bologna, and at the end of that same year he married a wealthy Bolognese, Lucrezia Usberti (died 1591). In 1576, as a result of a legal dispute over his wife's inheritance, Bottrigari fled to Ferrara where he remained for the next 11 years. During this time, as can be seen from his most important music treatise, Il Desiderio, overo de' concerti di varii strumenti musicali, he became acquainted with the rich musical life at the court of Alfonso II d'Este, and also came to know a number of poets and intellectuals including Girolamo and Melchiorre Zoppio and Torquato Tasso, who addressed three sonnets to him. Following his return to Bologna, some time after 12 October 1586, Bottrigari moved to the family house at Sant’Alberto. There he established himself as a private scholar, surrounded by his books and manuscripts and in contact with like-minded scholars (including Gioseffo Zarlino and Annibale Melone).

== Works ==
Bottrigari was essentially a humanist in the mould of Glarean, Mei and Zarlino; like them his interest in music was just one consequence of a consuming interest in the classical past, an interest characterized by his fondness for the dialogue form in his treatises, and by his preoccupation with Greek mathematics, astronomy and music theory. Bottrigari's first publication about music, Il Patricio (1593), takes issue with Franciscus Patricius' explanation of the Aristoxenian division of the tetrachord. In the following year Il Desiderio appeared. Cast, like Il Patricio, in the form of a dialogue, it is rich in information about contemporary musical instruments and paints a vivid portrait of musical life at the Estense court in Ferrara during the last decades of the 16th century. Il Melone, discorso armonico … et il Melone secondo is concerned with speculative theory and includes a long account of the Greek genera and the first published transcription of a Greek musical text. It also attacks Gandolfo Sigonio's Discorso sopra i madrigali and takes up the cause of modern composers and theorists, in particular Nicola Vicentino. One important work which remained in manuscript, the Mascara, overo della fabbrica de' teatri (1598), is a detailed discussion of the history and physical structure of theatres, and a valuable source of information about Renaissance practice.

== Links ==
Massimo Redaelli's edition of Ercole Bottrigari's manuscript works and their English translations are available online at www.mimtt.co.uk. Il Trimerone was published in saggi musicali italiani (online).
