= Curved space diamond structure =

Modular building system

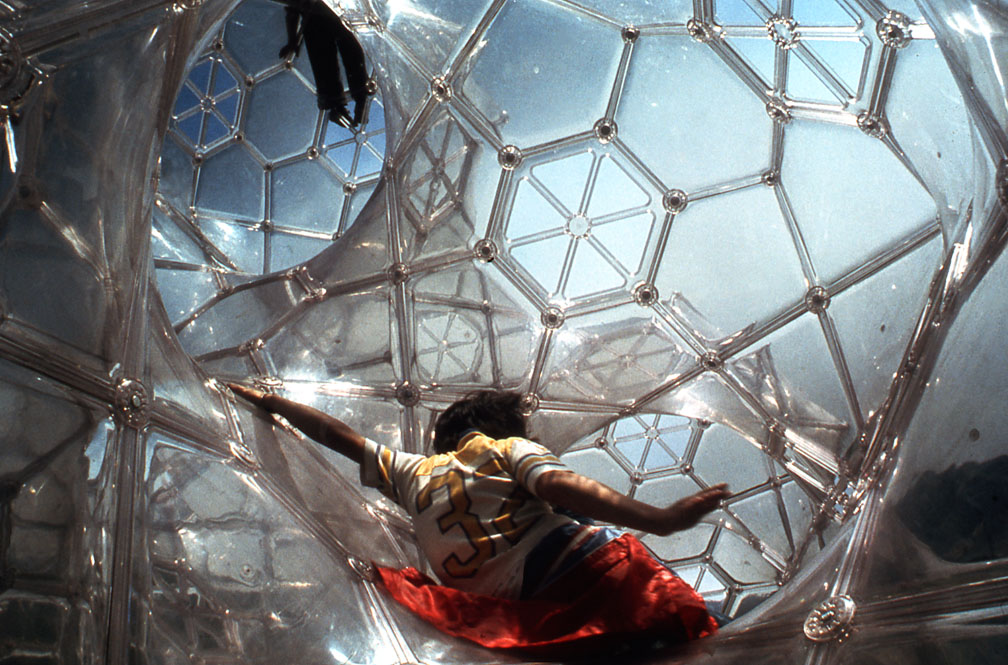
Curved Space Diamond Structure

The curved space diamond structure is a patented modular building system representative of a diamond crystal enlarged 8 billion times. These playground climbing sculptures were installed in dozens of parks and playgrounds in California, and also throughout the U.S. and Japan in the mid 1970s and early 1980s. Initially installed as playground climbing sculptures, they have also been exhibited as architectural design pieces, referred to as "usable artworks", and sold as art at auction.

The climbing sculptures were designed by Peter Jon Pearce who also designed the Biosphere 2 complex in Arizona, worked for Charles and Ray Eames, and was an assistant to Buckminster Fuller. In addition to playground installations, Curved Spaced Diamond Structures were installed at the 1975 Aspen Design Conference, The Brooklyn Children's Museum, Epcot theme park in Orlando, Florida, and The Hakone Open Air Museum in Japan. The sculptures are constructed of Lexan, a transparent polycarbonate plastic, having a lifespan of at least 20 years. The material used in their construction is tough enough to use as bulletproofing and the joining systems can withstand tensile loads of up to 1000 psi. In 1975, a Curved Space structure was constructed in Aspen Colorado, at the "Aspen Design Conference. Because of an overwhelming number of requests from the community, it was left standing until the end of summer, long after the conference was over. Three "Curved Space Labyrinths" installed in The Brooklyn Children's Museum in 1976, helped to teach children about the geometry of crystal structures. The Curved Space installation at the Hakone Open Air Museum in Japan was originally installed in 1978, and is frequently referred to as “The Soap Bubble Castle”. Marking the 40th anniversary of the museum, there has been an extensive remodel and the Curved Space playground exhibit has been replaced with a new and updated version. Since 1978, the sounds of happy children have always been heard coming from the exhibit at this museum. Originally installed at a playground in the suburbs of Chicago, one of Pearce's sculptures was available for purchase at the Wright Auction House, which specializes in modern and contemporary art, and according to Art & Antiques Magazine "The structure has subtle richness".

In the summer of 2013, a module of the Curved Space Diamond Structure, was on display at The Schindler House, in West Hollywood and at the Yale School of Architecture in New Haven, Connecticut, as part of an exhibition titled "Everything Loose Will Land", which highlighted Art and Architecture in 1970's Los Angeles. This exhibit, of the Getty Museum's "Pacific Standard Time Presents" series: "Modern Architecture in L.A.", was meant to focus our gaze on things we might see in everyday life outside of a museum setting.
