= Eames Lounge Chair =

Chair designed by Charles and Ray Eames

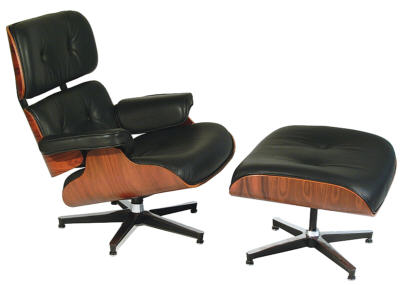
- Eames Lounge Chair and Ottoman
- Designer: Charles Eames and Ray Eames of the Eames Office
- Date: 1956
- Materials: Plywood, leather
- Style / tradition: Modern
- Sold by: Herman Miller (United States)

The Eames Lounge Chair and Ottoman is a lounge chair and ottoman manufactured and sold by American furniture company Herman Miller. Introduced in 1956, the Eames Lounge Chair was designed by Charles and Ray Eames of the Eames Office and is made of molded plywood and leather. It was the first chair the Eameses designed for the high-end market. The Eames Lounge Chair and Ottoman are part of the permanent collection of New York's Museum of Modern Art.

== Design ==
Designers Charles Eames and Ray Eames, of the Eames Office, sought to develop furniture that could be mass-produced and affordable, with the exception of the Eames Lounge Chair. The chair was inspired by the traditional English club chair. Though the Eames Lounge Chair later came to be considered an icon of modern design, when it was first made, Ray Eames remarked in a letter to Charles that the chair looked "comfortable and un-designy". Charles's vision was for a chair with "the warm, receptive look of a well-used first baseman's mitt".

The chair is composed of three curved plywood shells covered with veneer: the headrest, the backrest and the seat. The layers are glued together and shaped under heat and pressure. The shells and the seat cushions are essentially of the same shape, and composed of two curved forms interlocking to form a solid mass. The chair back and headrest are identical in proportion, as are the seat and the ottoman. They are officially titled Eames Lounge (670) and Ottoman (671). The chair was introduced in 1956 after years of development.

The Eames Chair has changed in various ways over time. Beginning in 1956 and running through the very early 1990s, the shells were made up of five thin layers of plywood which were covered by a veneer of Brazilian rosewood. The use of Brazilian rosewood was discontinued in the early 1990s, and current production since then consists of seven layers of plywood covered by finishing veneers of cherry, walnut, palisander rosewood (a sustainably grown wood with similar grain patterns to the original Brazilian versions), and other finishes.

Small hardware changes include the sets of spacers between the aluminum spines and the wood panels, originally of rubber, later hard plastic washers, and the number of screws securing the armrests, originally three, changed to two in second-series models, while the "domes of silence" (glides/feet) on the chair base originally had thinner screws attaching them to the aluminum base than those on later chairs, and the zipper around the cushions, either brown or black on early models, was later black only. Further, early ottomans had removable rubber slide-on feet with metal glides.

Labels to denote authenticity have changed over the decades, with the very first model from 1956 having a silver/white circular medallion containing the phrases "designed by Charles Eames" and "Herman Miller Zeeland Mich" changing to black oblong (1970s and 1980s), silver oblong (1990s and 2000s), and curved embossed (2000s–present).

== Sales and market ==
The Eames Lounge Chair first appeared on Arlene Francis' daytime program Home in 1956. After the debut, Herman Miller launched an advertising campaign that highlighted the versatility of the chair. Print ads depicted the 670 in a variety of settings, including in a Victorian parlor with a small girl sitting on the ottoman, occupied by a grandmother shelling peas on the front porch of an American Gothic-style house, with a sleeping clown outside of a circus train, and in the middle of a sunny field of hay.

Since its introduction, the chair has been in continuous production by MillerKnoll in the United States. Later, Vitra (in cooperation with the German furniture company Fritz Becker KG) began producing the chair for the European market. Production was licensed in the United Kingdom for 10 years to Hille International LTD from 1957.

The Eames Chair has been cited as one of the most counterfeited and copied pieces of furniture. Immediately following its release, other furniture companies began to copy its design, some being direct copies and others merely being influenced by its design. The former Plycraft Company issued dozens of chairs that were direct copies or in its style. Later, Chinese and European companies began making direct copies. However, Herman Miller and Vitra remain the only two companies to produce these chairs with the Eames name attached. In 1962, the Eameses took out full-page newspaper advertisements warning consumers about counterfeits.

In 2006, to commemorate the 50th anniversary of the chair, Miller released models using a sustainable palisander rosewood veneer. In 2008 both Herman Miller & Vitra developed a tall (known as XL in Europe) version offering a higher and deeper sizing.

== On display ==
- A 1956 rosewood Eames Lounge Chair and ottoman are in the permanent collection of the Museum of Modern Art in New York City. The set was a gift of the Herman Miller Company, donated in 1960.
- A rosewood Eames Lounge Chair and ottoman are on display at the Henry Ford Museum in Dearborn, Michigan.
- A walnut or rosewood Eames Lounge Chair and ottoman are on display and in the permanent collection of the Museum of Fine Arts Boston.

== See also ==
- Chaise longue
- Eames Lounge Chair Wood
- Eames Fiberglass Armchair
