= Toccata for Toy Trains =

1957 short film

- Directed by: Charles Eames; Ray Eames
- Produced by: Charles Eames; Ray Eames
- Starring: Charles Eames
- Music by: Elmer Bernstein
- Production company: Office of Charles & Ray Eames
- Distributed by: George K. Arthur
- Release date: 1957
- Running time: 14 minutes
- Country: United States
- Language: English

Toccata for Toy Trains is a 1957 short film by Charles and Ray Eames, one of several films (including Powers of Ten, made many years later) the husband-and-wife design team made during their career. It was inspired by the gift of a toy locomotive given by Academy Award-winning director Billy Wilder.

Toccata for Toy Trains is also the title of the instrumental music composed for the film by Elmer Bernstein, a frequent collaborator on the Eames films.

== Summary ==
The film features mostly antique toy trains moving within fanciful settings to a toccata. Other antique toys, such as dolls (representing passengers and townspeople), automobiles and horse-drawn carriages are featured.

Most of the toys come from a mix of museum and private collections, including that of the Museum of the City of New York, and apparently date from before the 1920s. The film is shot from a toy's-eye-view, as if the viewer is following the journey of trains from two cities, beginning with the busy activity of the departure train station and surrounding downtown neighborhood, traveling across the countryside, and ending with trains pulling into the arrival station.

A short opening narration by Charles Eames, set in a roundhouse, extols the design merits of toys, especially antique toys, with their "direct and unembarrassed manner", versus scale models. Eames says the modern era has lost the art of toymaking in the attempt to have "a perfect little copy of the real thing".

== Accolades ==
- Edinburgh International Film Festival Award, 1957
- Seventh Melbourne Film Festival Award, 1958
- American Film Festival Award, 1959
- Scholastic Teachers’ 11th Annual Film Award, 1960

== See also ==
- List of American films of 1957
