= Peter Jon Pearce =

American product designer and author

- Born: October 8, 1936 (age 89); Geneva, New York, United States
- Occupations: American product designer, author, and inventor.

Peter Jon Pearce (October 8, 1936) is an American product designer, author, and inventor.

He is the designer of the Cachet Chair, Manufactured by Steelcase, as well as the designer of the Curved Space Diamond Structure, a playground climbing sculpture, installed at playgrounds throughout the U.S., The Brooklyn Children's Museum, and the Hakone Open Air Museum in Japan, where it has been a popular attraction since 1978. He earned his degree in product design from IIT Institute of Design.

Pearce was offered a job with Charles Eames after Eames saw the bent-plywood lounge chair he made in college. While employed by Eames he contributed to the following projects:

-Made adaptations to the design of the furniture bases for the "Aluminum Group Furniture".

-Member of the Eames design and production crew for the film "Glimpses of the U.S.A."

-One of four team members who produced the prototypes of the "Time-Life Chair and Stool", designed for the Time & Life Building lobbies.

-Staff member involved in the development of the 1961 "La Fonda Chair", made for the La Fonda del Sol restaurant which opened in New York's Time & Life Building, in 1961.

-Staff member involved in the development of the "Eames Contract Storage" units.

-One of four team members who produced the prototype of the "Eames Tandem Sling Seating", initially installed at O'Hare and Dulles airports.

-Staff member involved in the development of the 3473 Sofa.

He was an assistant to Buckminster Fuller and is the author of several books including "Structure in Nature Is a Strategy for Design". His focus on high-performance design, and on achieving sustainability in his designs, is seen in the methodologies used in the design of the Cachet Chair, his work on Biosphere 2, and in the design of the Pearce Ecohouse. The Pearce Ecohouse design, emulates the hexagonal structures of nature and is a green structure built from glass and steel using prefab construction. It is solar powered and will use net-zero energy.

== Publications ==
- Pearce, Peter, and Susan Pearce. Experiments in Form: A Foundation Course in Three-Dimensional Design. New York: Van Nostrand Reinhold Co, 1980. ISBN 9780442264970
- Pearce, Peter, and Susan Pearce. Polyhedra Primer. New York: Van Nostrand Reinhold, 1978. ISBN 0-442-26496-8
- Pearce, Peter. Structure in Nature Is a Strategy for Design. Cambridge: MIT Press, 1978. ISBN 9780262160643

== Patents ==
- Peter J Pearce Patents

== Exhibitions ==
- Pacific Standard Time Presents series:Modern Architecture in L.A. at the Getty Museum (2013)
- Everything Loose Will Land at The Schindler House (2013)
