= Annette Del Zoppo =

American photographer (1936–2001)

- Annette Del Zoppo, from a 1954 yearbook
- Born: Anna Marie Del Zoppo; January 4, 1936; Hollywood, California
- Died: November 2, 2001 (aged 65)
- Occupations: photographer, graphic designer, multimedia producer, activist

Anna Marie "Annette" Del Zoppo (January 4, 1936 – November 2, 2001) was a Southern California–based photographer, graphic designer, multimedia producer, business owner, and community activist. She was a frequent contributor to Los Angeles–based publications, and was associated with the office of Charles and Ray Eames in the 1960s.

== Early life and education ==
Anna Marie Del Zoppo was born in Hollywood, California, the daughter of Anthony Frank Del Zoppo and Anna Louise Rappatoni Del Zoppo. Her father and her maternal grandparents were born in Italy. Her brother, Alex Del Zoppo, was a member of the band Sweetwater. She graduated from John Marshall High School, then studied architecture at the University of Southern California, and filmmaking at UCLA.

== Career ==
Del Zoppo worked in the office of Charles and Ray Eames from 1961 to 1970, producing media and projects including films, presentations, and exhibits. From the 1960s through the 1980s, Del Zoppo photographed and filmed the work of architect Paolo Soleri at both Cosanti and Arcosanti. She was one of the five photographers featured in "L.A. Flash", a 1973 show about street fashion, organized at the Los Angeles County Museum of Art. Another of her projects was a 1978 photographic history of Venice, California, covering the period from 1904 to 1930. Over a period of two years, as Director of Environmental Photography, Del Zoppo and her staff photographed all phases of the design program for the 1984 XXIIIrd Olympic Games in Los Angeles. She was also a member of the faculty at the Design Forum of the Southern California Institute of Architecture.

In the late 1960s, Del Zoppo and cabinetmaker Parke Meek, her business partner, opened a vintage clothing store named "Ephemera". She was active in the cause of tenants' rights in her later years.

== Publications ==
- Paolo Soleri (1973, with Jeffrey Cook)
- The Vegreville Pysanka (1976)
- Venice, California, 1904–1930 (1978, with Jeffrey Stanton)
- The Environmental Design of the 1984 Olympics in Los Angeles (1986, video)

== Personal life ==
Del Zoppo married fellow photographer Jim Simmons. She died from lung cancer in 2001, in Los Angeles, at the age of 65.
