= Zoppo =

Zoppo is an Italian surname. Notable people with the surname include:

- Marco Zoppo (1433–1498), Italian Renaissance painter
- Paolo Zoppo, Italian Renaissance painter
- Rocco Zoppo, real name Giovan Maria di Bartolomeo Bacci di Belforte (fl. 1496–1508), Italian Renaissance painter

== See also ==
- Delzoppo
