= Charles and Ray Eames =

Architectural and design duo

Eames Office
- Charles and Ray preparing to leave Los Angeles with films for the 1959 American National Exhibition in Moscow, USSR.

Significant works and honors
- Buildings: Eames House
- Projects: Eames Lounge Chair Wood (LCW); Eames lounge chair and ottoman Powers of Ten; Mathematica: A World of Numbers... and Beyond
- Awards: AIA Twenty-five Year Award, 1977; Royal Gold Medal, 1979 "The Most Influential Designer of the 20th Century" IDSA 1985; Honorary Doctorate, Otis College of Art and Design, 1984.

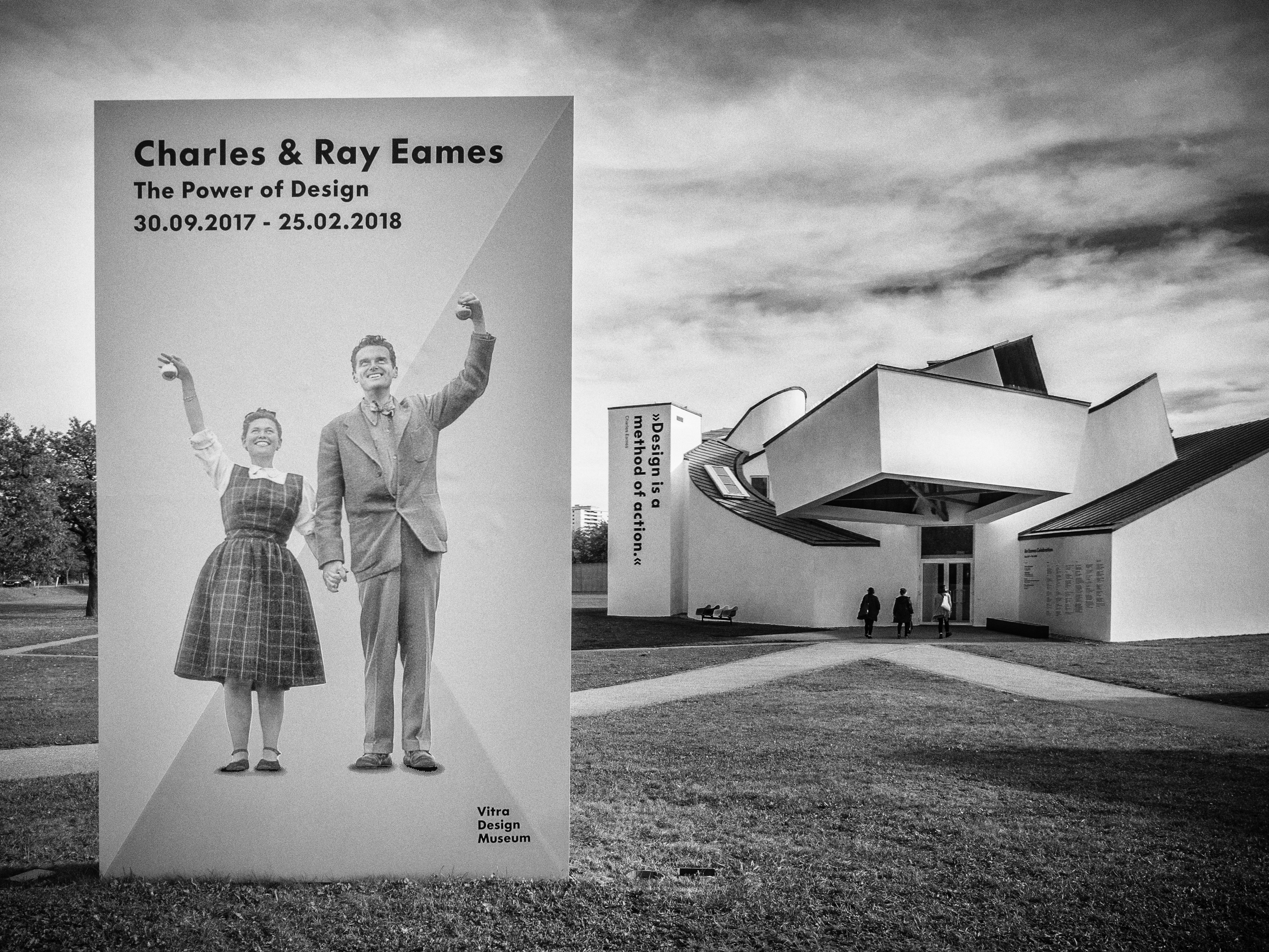
Charles & Ray Eames, The Power of Design, Vitra Design Museum

Charles Eames Jr. and Ray-Bernice Eames, an American married couple of industrial designers, made significant historical contributions to the development of modern architecture and furniture through the work of the Eames Office. They also worked in the fields of industrial and graphic design, fine art, and film. Charles was the public face of the Eames Office, but Ray and Charles worked together as creative partners and employed a diverse creative staff. Among their most recognized designs are the Eames Lounge Chair, Eames Fiberglass Armchair, and the Eames Aluminum Group.

== Background ==
Charles Eames secured an architecture scholarship at Washington University, but his devotion to the practices of Frank Lloyd Wright caused issues with his tutors and he left after two years of study.

He met Ray Kaiser at the Cranbrook Academy of Art in 1940. Charles arrived at the school on an industrial design fellowship as recommended by Eliel Saarinen, but soon became an instructor. Ray enrolled in various courses to expand upon her previous education in abstract painting in New York City under the guidance of Hans Hofmann. Charles entered into a furniture competition—with his “best friend” Eero Saarinen—hosted by the Museum of Modern Art. Eames and Saarinen's goal was to mold a single piece of plywood into a chair; the Organic Chair was born out of this attempt. Ray stepped in to help with the graphic design for their entry. The chair won first prize, but its form was unable to be successfully mass-produced. Eames and Saarinen considered it a failure, as the tooling for molding a chair from a single piece of wood had not yet been invented.

Eames divorced his first wife Catherine Woermann, and he and Ray married in June 1941. Their honeymoon was a road trip to relocate to Los Angeles.

Their first home, after staying in a hotel for a few weeks, was Richard Neutra's Strathmore Apartments in the Westwood neighborhood. Charles and Ray began creating tooling and molding plywood into chairs in the second bedroom of the apartment, eventually finding more adequate work spaces in Venice.

== The Eames Office ==
The design office of Charles and Ray Eames functioned for more than four decades (1943–1988) in the former Bay Cities Garage at 901 Abbot Kinney Boulevard in Venice, Los Angeles, California.

The Eameses worked approximately 13-hour days, six or seven days a week, and directed the work of a team of collaborators. Through the years, its staff included many notable designers: Gregory Ain (who was Chief Engineer for the Eameses during World War II), Don Albinson, Harry Bertoia, Annette Del Zoppo, Peter Jon Pearce, and Deborah Sussman. The Eameses believed in "learning by doing"; before introducing a new idea at the Eames Office, Charles and Ray extensively explored needs and constraints of the idea.

=== Early use of plywood ===
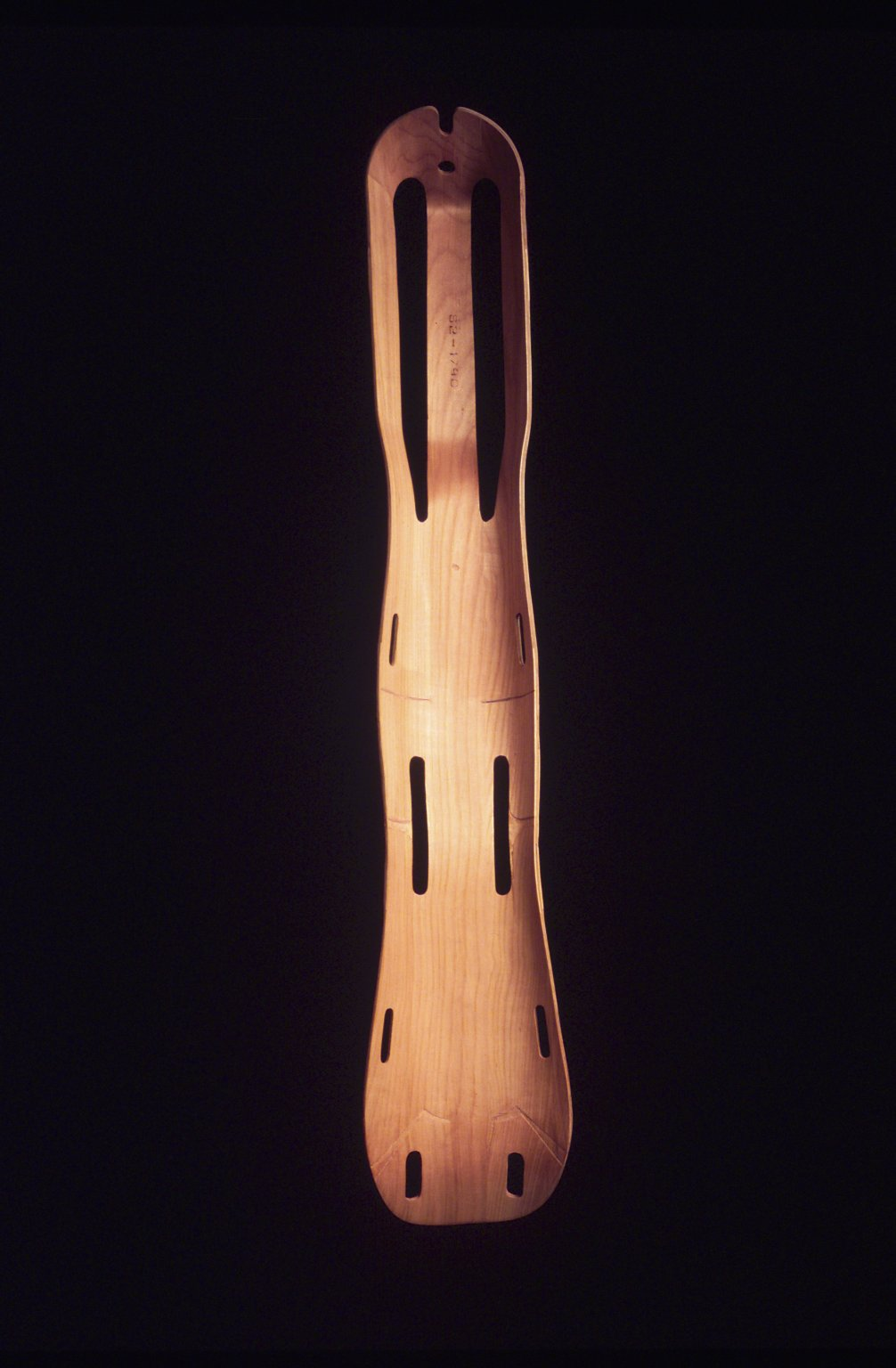
Charles Eames, Leg Splint, designed 1941–1942 Brooklyn Museum

The Eameses began exploration into bent plywood as early as 1941, seeing the potential of a lightweight and low-cost material. However, manufacturers lacked the capacity to bring their ideas to life. In 1942, the Eameses built a plywood-curing oven, named Kazam!, in their apartment. From Kazam!, they produced their first bent-plywood seat shell.

In late 1941, the Eameses began developing a leg splint for wounded soldiers during WWII. This was in response to medical officers in combat zones reporting the need for improved emergency transport splints. The splints needed to be lightweight, stackable, and tightly support the form of the human leg without cutting off circulation. Using a mold from Charles's leg, they set about applying their experiments in bent plywood to the use-case of splints. The Eameses created their splints from wood veneers, which they bonded together with a resin glue and shaped into compound curves using a process involving heat and pressure. With the introduction of plywood splints, they were able to replace problematic metal traction splints that had side effects of inducing gangrene due to impairment of blood circulation. The US Navy's funding for the splints allowed Charles and Ray to begin experimenting more heavily with furniture designs and mass production.

In 1942 and 1943, the Eameses also experimented with large, bent-plywood sculptures as a way of testing the limits of the technology and experimenting with new forms.

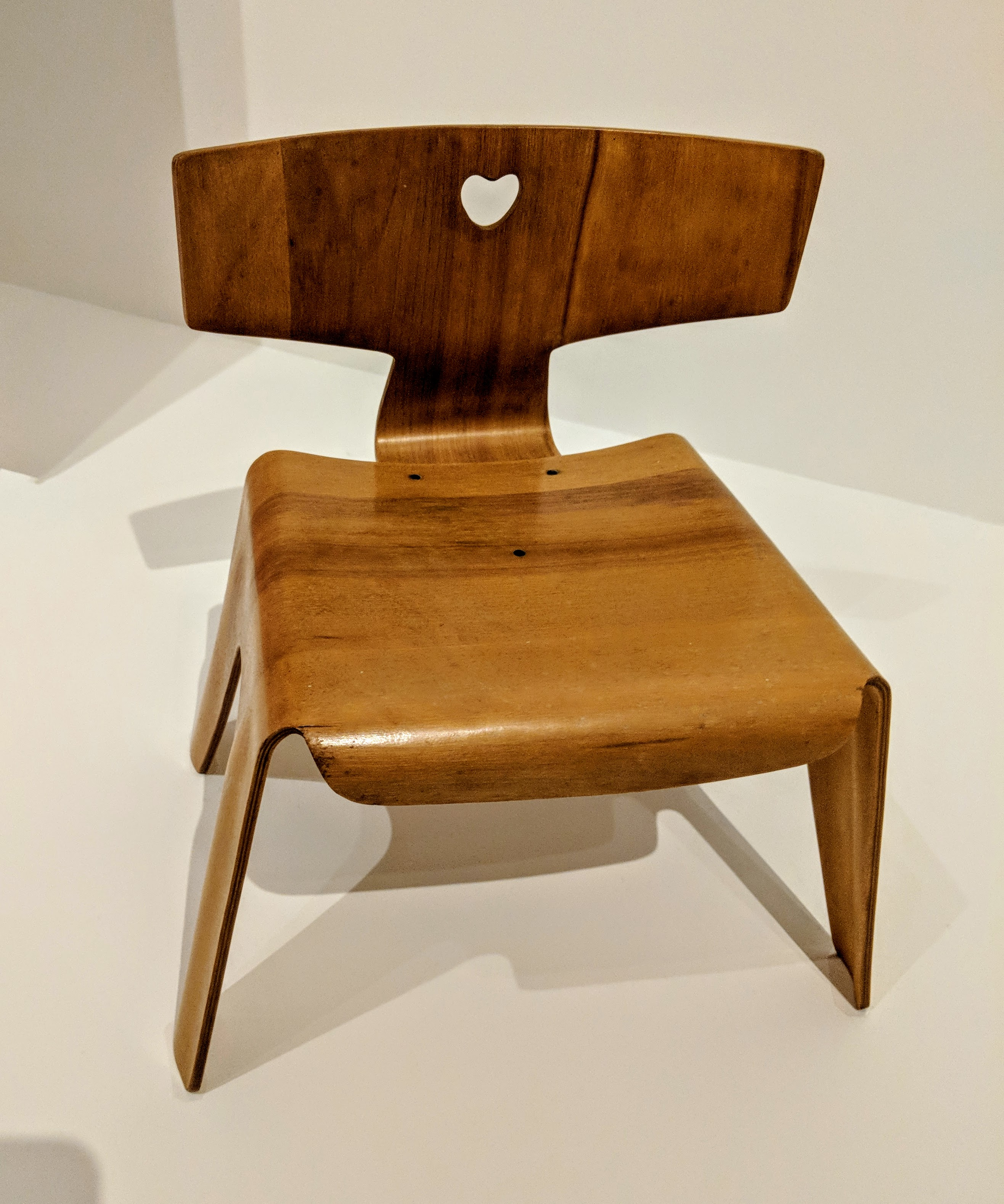
Eames stacking chair for children, on display at the Oakland Museum of California, 2018

=== Domestic furniture design ===
Eames products were manufactured on Washington Boulevard until the 1950s. Among the many important designs originating there are the molded-plywood DCW (Dining Chair Wood) and DCM (Dining Chair Metal with a plywood seat) (1945); Eames Lounge Chair (1956); the Aluminum Group furniture (1958); the Eames Chaise (1968), designed for Charles's friend and film director, Billy Wilder; the Solar Do-Nothing Machine (1957), an early solar energy experiment for the Aluminum Corporation of America; and a number of toys.

At the time of Charles' death they were working on what became their last production, the Eames Sofa, which went into production thanks to Ray's efforts in 1984.

=== Office furniture design ===
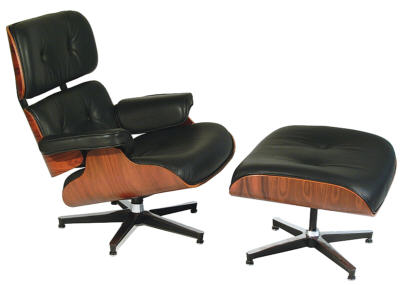
Eames Lounge (670) and Ottoman (671) 1956

The Eames lounge chair designed in 1956 for Herman Miller quickly became a prototype for ergonomic furniture. As with their earlier molded plywood work, the Eames' pioneered technologies, such as using fiberglass as a materials for mass-produced furniture. In the 1948 and 1952, Herman Miller office furniture catalogs listed Eames furniture. Herman Miller relocated the tooling and resources for the mass production of Eames designs to its headquarters in Zeeland, Michigan in 1958. Herman Miller, along with their European counterpart Vitra, remain the only licensed manufacturers of Eames furniture and products.

=== Fabric design ===
In August 2005, Maharam fabrics reissued Eames designed fabrics; Sea Things (1947) pattern and Dot Pattern. Dot Pattern was conceived for The Museum of Modern Art's “Competition for Printed Fabrics” in 1947. The Eames fabrics were designed solely by Ray.

=== Films ===
Charles and Ray channeled their separate interest in photography and theatre into the production of 125 short films. From their first film, the unfinished Traveling Boy (1950), to the most-recognized Powers of Ten (re-released in 1977), to their last film in 1982, their cinematic work was an outlet for ideas, a vehicle for experimentation and education. The couple often produced short films to document their interests, such as collecting toys and cultural artifacts on their travels. The films also record the process of hanging their exhibits or producing classic furniture designs. One film, Blacktop, filmed soap suds and water moving over the pavement of a parking lot, a normally mundane subject turned visually poetic. Powers of Ten (narrated by physicist Philip Morrison) gives a dramatic demonstration of orders of magnitude by visually zooming away from the earth to the edge of the universe, and then microscopically zooming into the nucleus of a carbon atom. The "Powers of Ten shot" has been referenced by Hollywood as a praised filming technique.

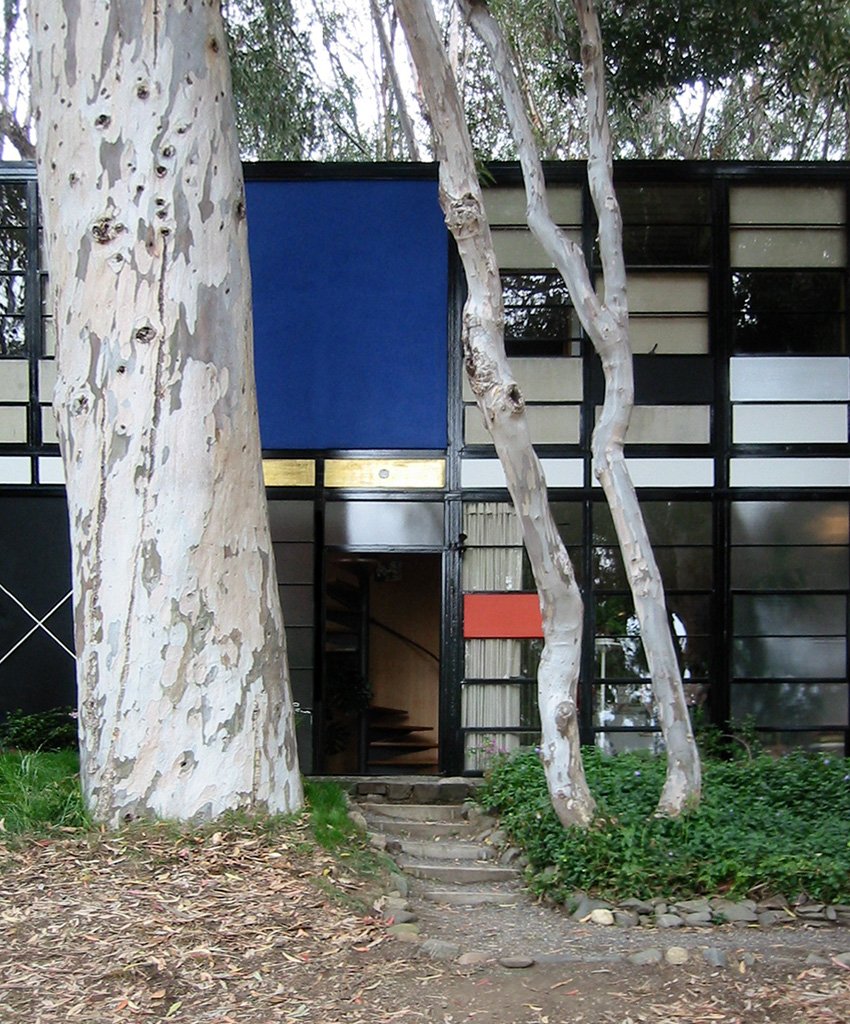
Eames House entry (Case Study House #8 built in 1949)

=== Architecture ===
Charles attended Washington University from 1936 to 1938 and was expelled from the architecture program due to his loyalty to the practices of Frank Lloyd Wright. He constructed two churches in Arkansas and three homes in St. Louis without an architecture license. He relocated to Michigan to attend the Cranbrook Academy of Art.

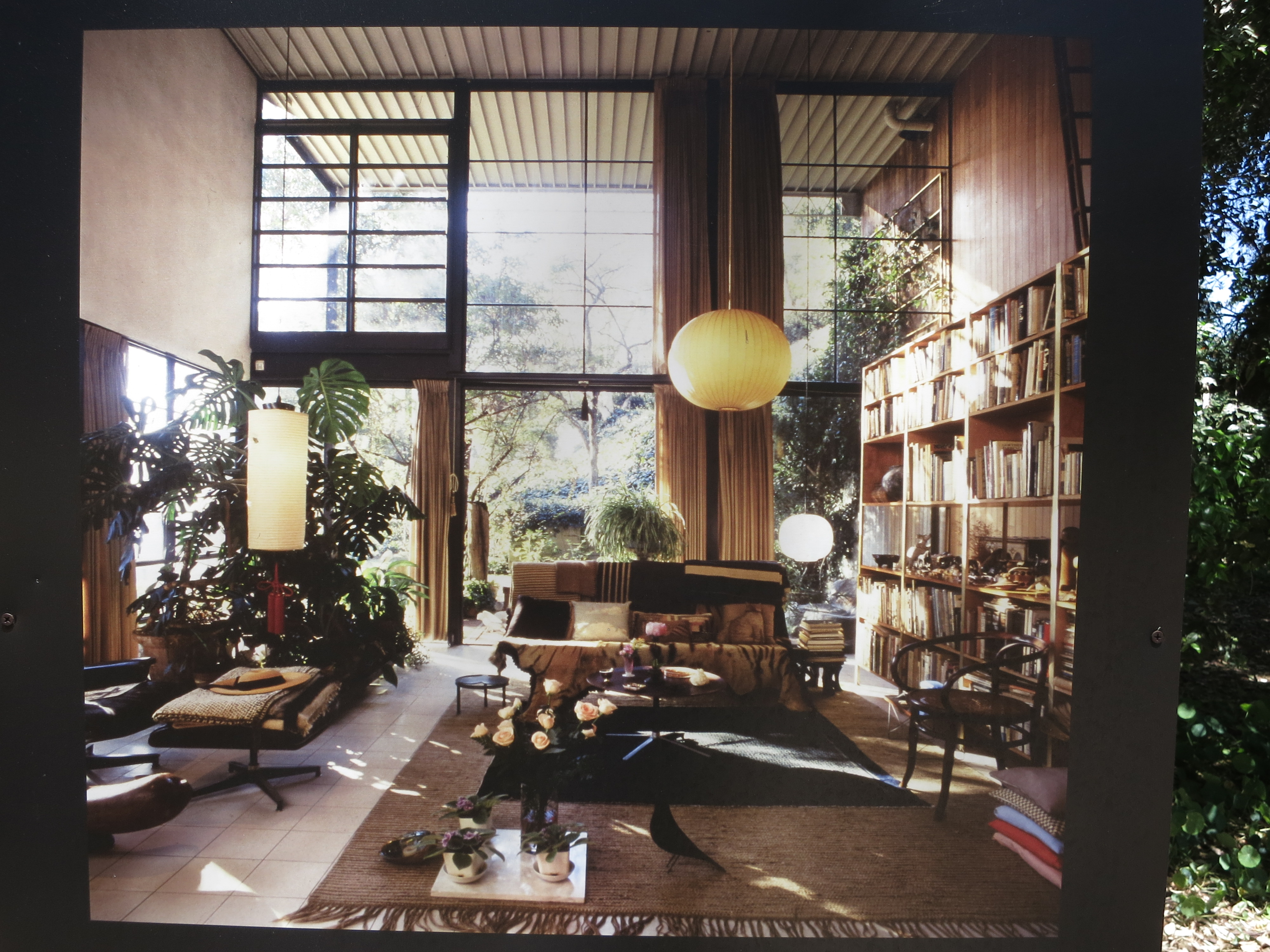
Eames House interior

Three years after arriving in Los Angeles, Charles and Ray were asked to participate in the Case Study House Program, a housing program sponsored by Arts & Architecture magazine in the hopes of showcasing examples of economically-priced modern homes that used wartime and industrial materials. John Entenza, the owner and editor of Arts & Architecture magazine, recognized the importance of Charles and Ray's thinking and design practices—alongside becoming a close friend of the couple. Charles and Eero Saarinen were hired to design Case Study House number 8, which would be the residence of Charles and Ray, and Case Study House number 9, which would house John Entenza, in 1945. The two homes (alongside other Case Study houses) would share a five-acre parcel of land in the Pacific Palisades neighborhood north of Santa Monica, which overlooked the Pacific Ocean. Because of post-war material rationing, the materials ordered for the first draft of the Eames House (called “the Bridge House”) were backordered. Charles and Ray spent many days and nights on-site in the meadow picnicking, shooting arrows, and socializing with family, friends, and coworkers. They developed a love for the eucalyptus grove, the expanse of land, and the unobstructed view of the ocean. They decided to not build the Bridge House and instead reconfigured the materials to create two separate structures nestled into the property's hillside. Eero Saarinen had no part in this second draft of the Eames House; it was a collaboration only between Charles and Ray. The materials were finally delivered and the house was erected from February through December 1949. The Eames' moved in on Christmas Eve and it became their only residence for the remainder of their lives. It remains a milestone of modern architecture.

The Eames Office designed a few more pieces of architecture, many of which were never built. The Herman Miller Showroom on Beverly Boulevard in Los Angeles was built in 1950 and the DePree House was constructed in Zeeland, Michigan for Max DePree, son of the founder of Herman Miller, and his growing family. Unbuilt projects include the Billy Wilder House, the prefabricated kit home known as the Kwikset House, and a national aquarium.

=== Exhibition design ===
The Eameses also conceived and designed a number of exhibitions. The first of these, Mathematica: A World of Numbers... and Beyond (1961), was sponsored by IBM, and is the only Eames exhibition still in existence. The Mathematica exhibition is still considered a model for science popularization exhibitions. It was followed by A Computer Perspective: Background to the Computer Age (1971) and The World of Franklin and Jefferson (1975–1977), among others.

== List of works ==
=== Architecture ===
- Sweetzer House, 1931 (Charles only)
- St. Mary's Church, Helena, Arkansas, 1934 (Charles only)
- St. Mary's Catholic Church, Paragould, Arkansas, 1935 (Charles only)
- Meyer House, Huntleigh, Missouri, 1936–1938 (Charles only)
- Dinsmoor House, 1936 (Charles only)
- Dean House, 1936 (Charles only)
- City Hall, 1944 (unbuilt, for Architectural Forum magazine competition)
- Bridge House, 1945 (Charles and Eero Sarrinen, unbuilt)
- Jefferson National Expansion Memorial Competition, 1947 (St. Louis Gateway Arch by Eero Saarinen won the competition)
- Eames House, Case Study House 8, Pacific Palisades, California, 1949
- Entenza House, Case Study House 9, Pacific Palisades, California, 1950
- Billy Wilder House, Beverly Hills, California, 1950 (unbuilt)
- Herman Miller Showroom, Los Angeles, California, 1950
- Kwikset House, 1951 (unbuilt)
- Max and Esther DePree House, Zeeland, Michigan, 1954
- Griffith Park Railroad, Los Angeles, California, 1957
- Revell Toy House, 1959 (unbuilt)
- The Time-Life Building Lobby, 1961
- National Fisheries Center and Aquarium, Washington D.C., 1967 (unbuilt)
- Metropolitan Museum of Art remodel, New York City, 1975 (unbuilt)

=== Films (selected) ===
- Traveling Boy (1950)
- Blacktop: A Story of the Washing of a School Play Yard (1952)
- Parade Parade Or Here They Are Coming Down Our Street (1952)
- Circus (1953)
- A Communications Primer (1953)^{[13]}
- House: After Five Years of Living (1955)
- Day of the Dead (1957)
- Toccata for Toy Trains (1957)
- The Information Machine (1957)^{[14]}
- Solar Do-Nothing Machine (1957)
- India (1958)
- Glimpses of the USA (1959)
- An Introduction to Feedback (1959)
- Kaleidoscope Jazz Chair (1960)
- Tivoli Slide Show (1961)
- Furniture: Beautiful Details (1961)
- IBM Mathematics Peep Show (1961), short documentary based on Mathematica: A World of Numbers... and Beyond exhibit by Eames
- House of Science (1962)
- IBM Fair Presentation Film #2 (1963)
- THINK (1964)
- Smithsonian Institution (1965)
- Herman Miller International Slideshow (1967)
- G.E.M. Slide Show (1967)
- Picasso Slide Show (1967)
- National Fisheries Center and Aquarium (1967)
- A Computer Glossary (1968)
- Babbage’s Calculating Machine or Difference Engine (1968)
- Tops (1969)
- Image of the City (1969)^{[15]}
- The Black Ships (1970)
- Soft Pad (1970)
- Circus Slide Show (1970)
- Louvre Slide Show (1970)
- Cemeteries Slide Show (1970)
- Tim Gad Slide Show (1971)
- Goods Slide Show (1971)
- Baptistery Slide Show (1971)
- Computer Perspective (1972)
- Alpha (1972)
- SX-70, promotional announcement/documentary of the Polaroid Corporation SX-70 instant camera
- Banana Leaf (1972)
- Design Q&A (1972)
- Copernicus (1973)
- Atlas: A Sketch of the Rise and Fall of the Roman Empire (1976)
- Powers of Ten (1968, rereleased in 1977)
- Goods (1981)

=== Furniture ===
- Kleinhans Music Hall Chair (1939–1940) Charles Eames, Eero Saarinen, Eliel Saarinen
- Conversation Armchair (1940) Charles Eames & Eero Saarinen
- Side Chair (1940) Charles Eames & Eero Saarinen
- Molded Plywood Pilot's Seat (1943)
- Prototype Plywood and Metal Chairs (various models) (1943–1946)
- Molded Plywood Elephant (1945)
- Lounge Chair Wood or LCW (1945–1946)
- Lounge Chair Metal or LCM (1945–1946)
- Dining Chair Wood or DCW (1945–1946)
- Dining Chair Metal or DCM (1945–1946)
- Molded Plywood Folding Screen (1945–1946)
- Molded Plywood Coffee Table wood or metal legs (1945–1946)
- "Donstrosity" prototype lounge (1946)
- Prototype Plywood Lounge with metal base (1946)
- Prototype Stamped Metal Chairs (1948)
- LaChaise prototype (1948)
- Molded Plastic & Fiberglass Armchair Shell various bases (1948–1950)
- Wire Mesh Side Chair or DKR (1951)
- Hang-It-All (1953)
- 670 & 671 or Eames Lounge & Ottoman (1956)
- Leisure Group (later Aluminum Group): High Back Lounge, Low Back Lounge, Dining Side Chair (1958)
- Eames Chaise (1968)
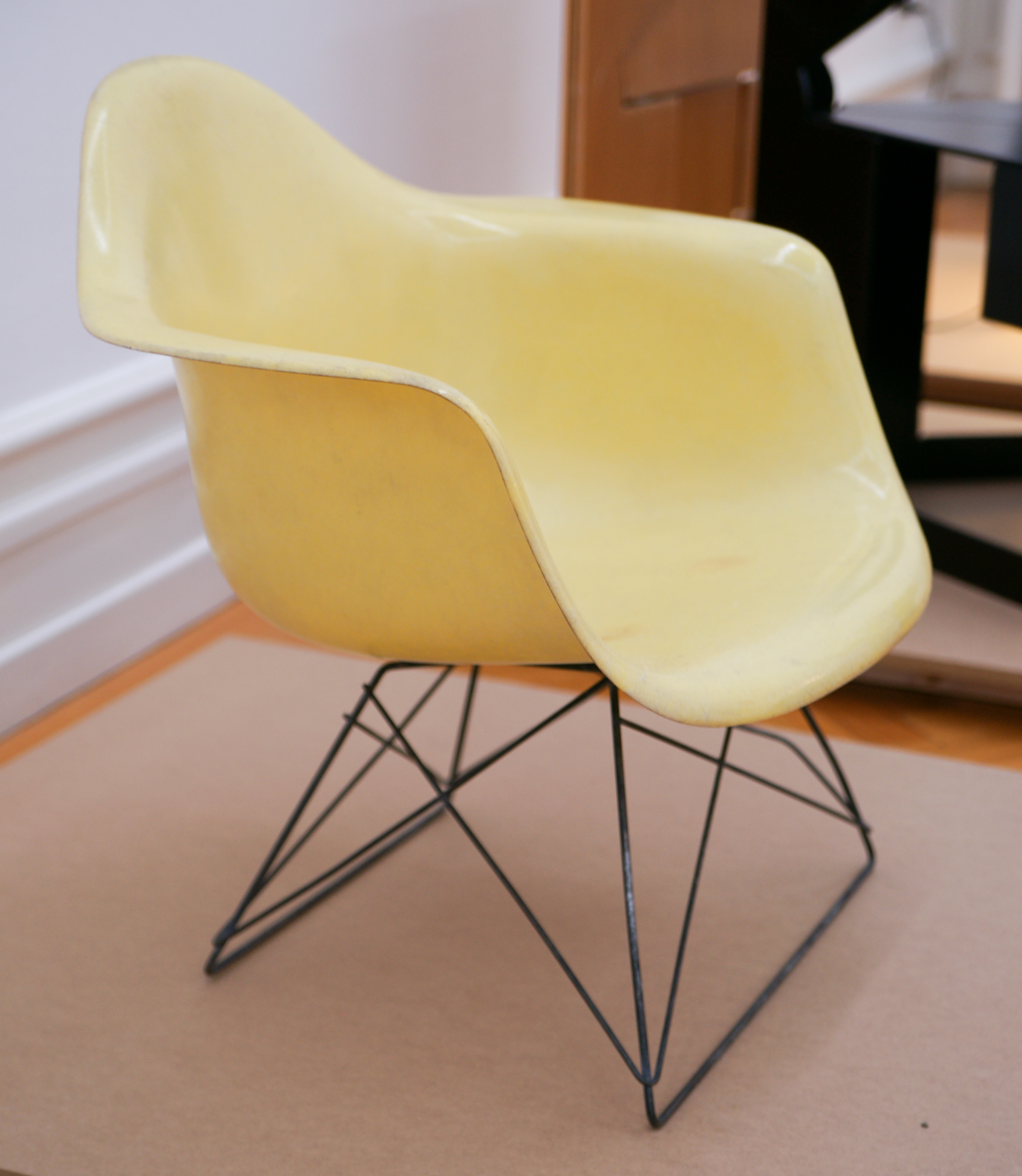
Plastic chair

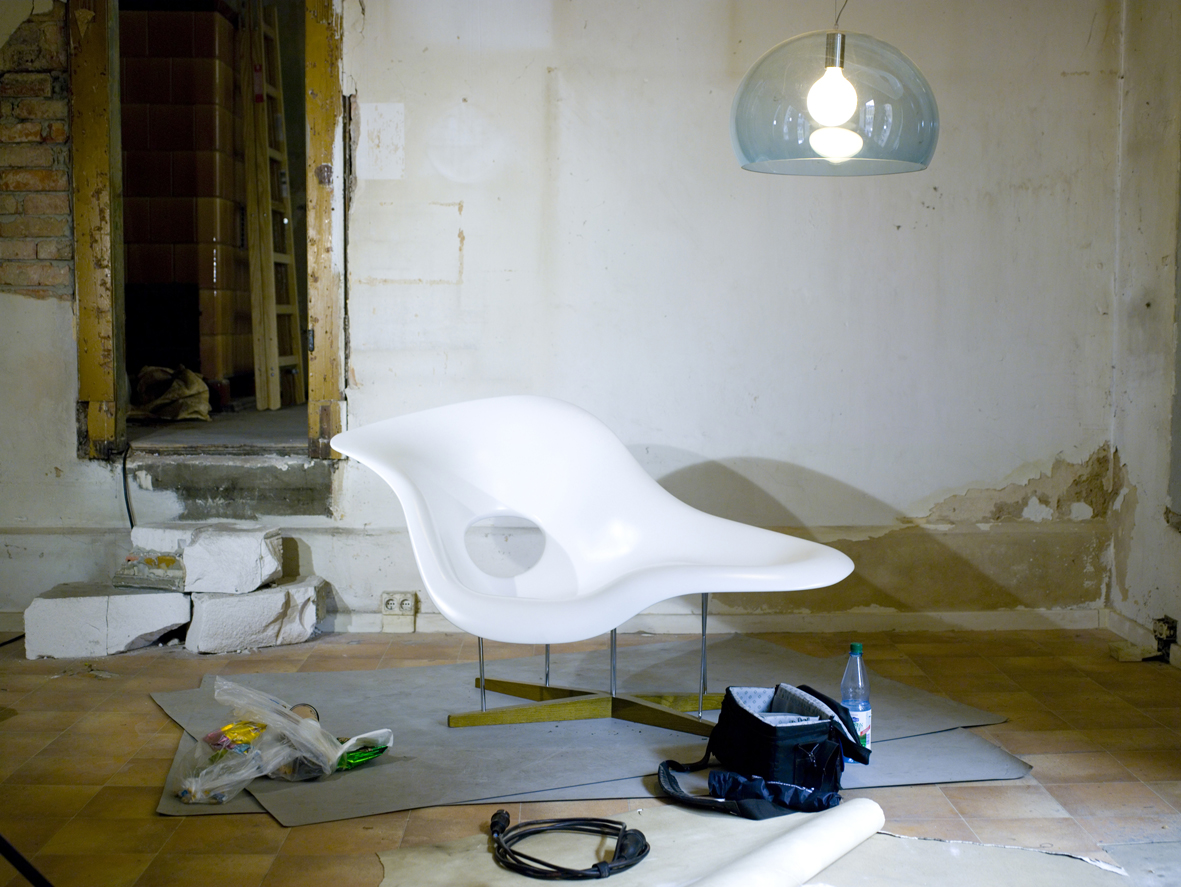
La Chaise

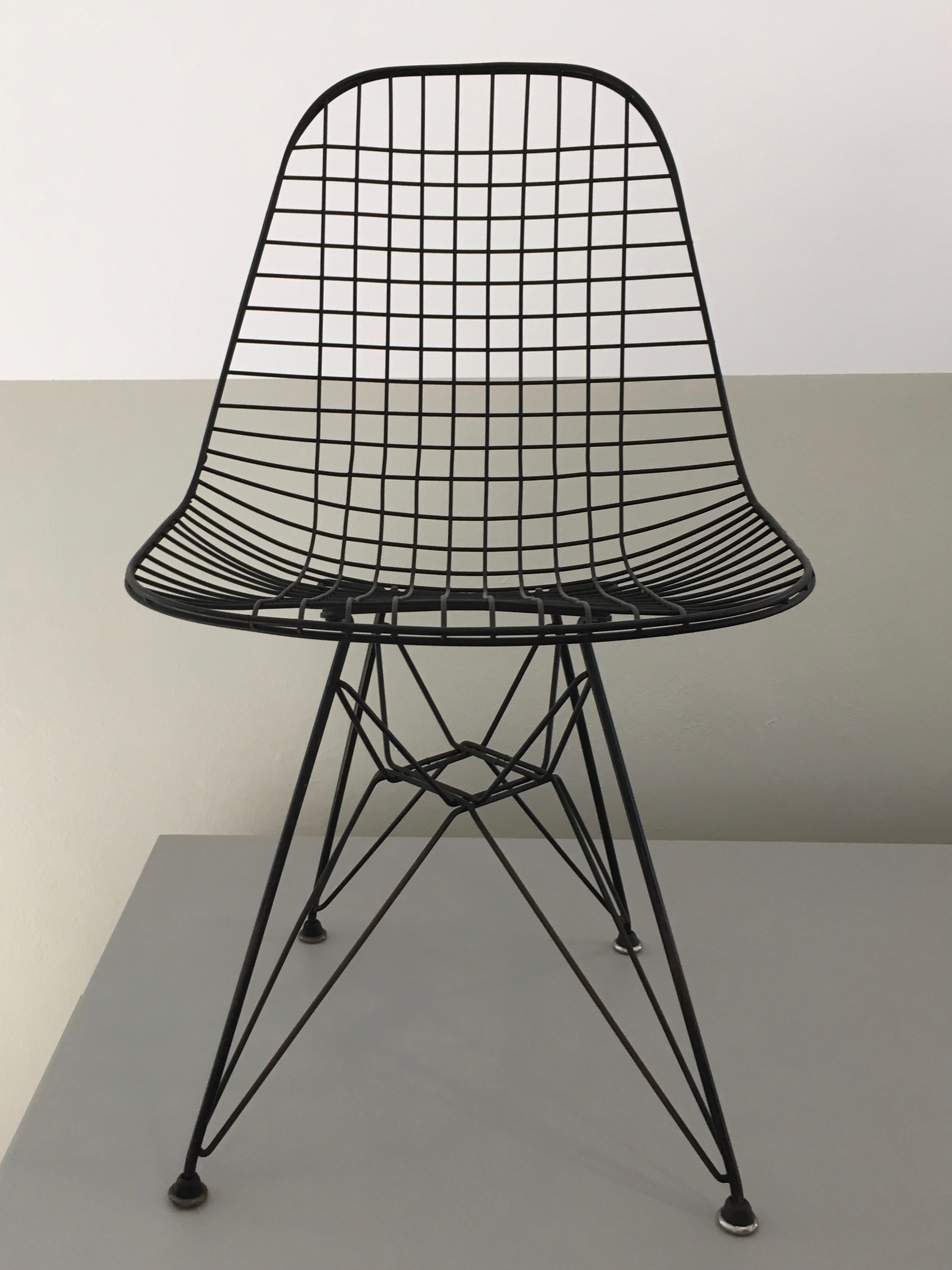
Bucket chair

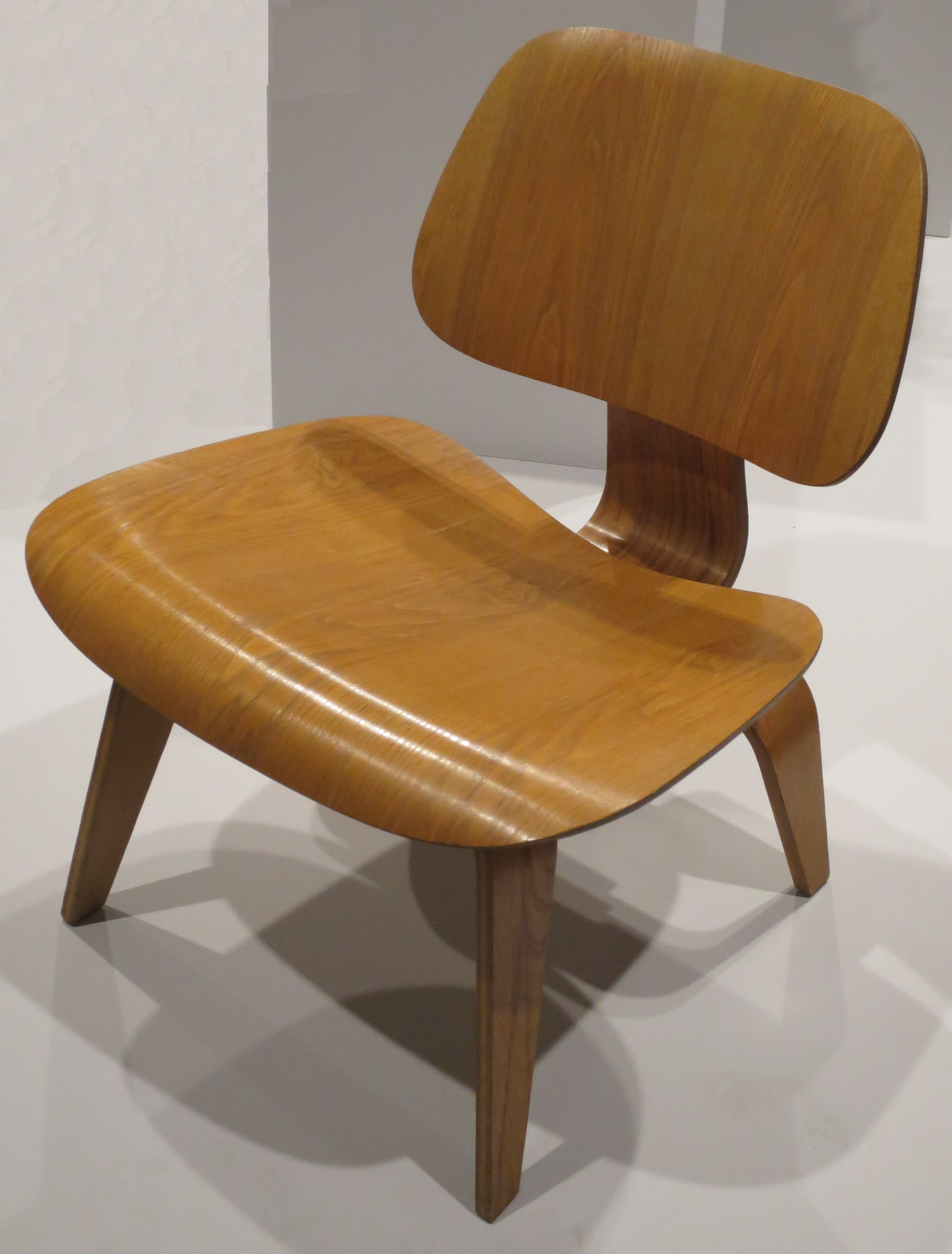
Lounge Chair Wood

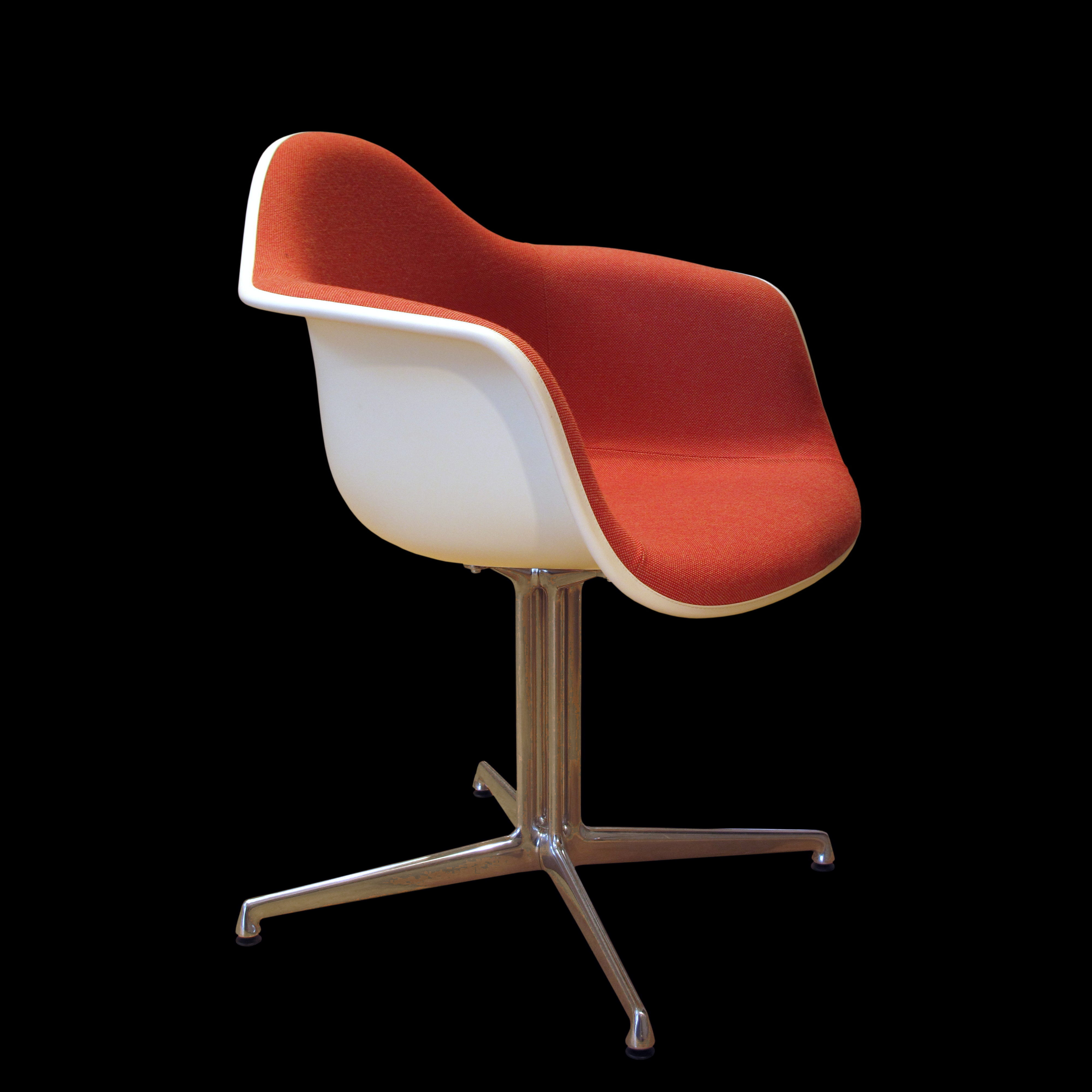
Fiberglass Armchair

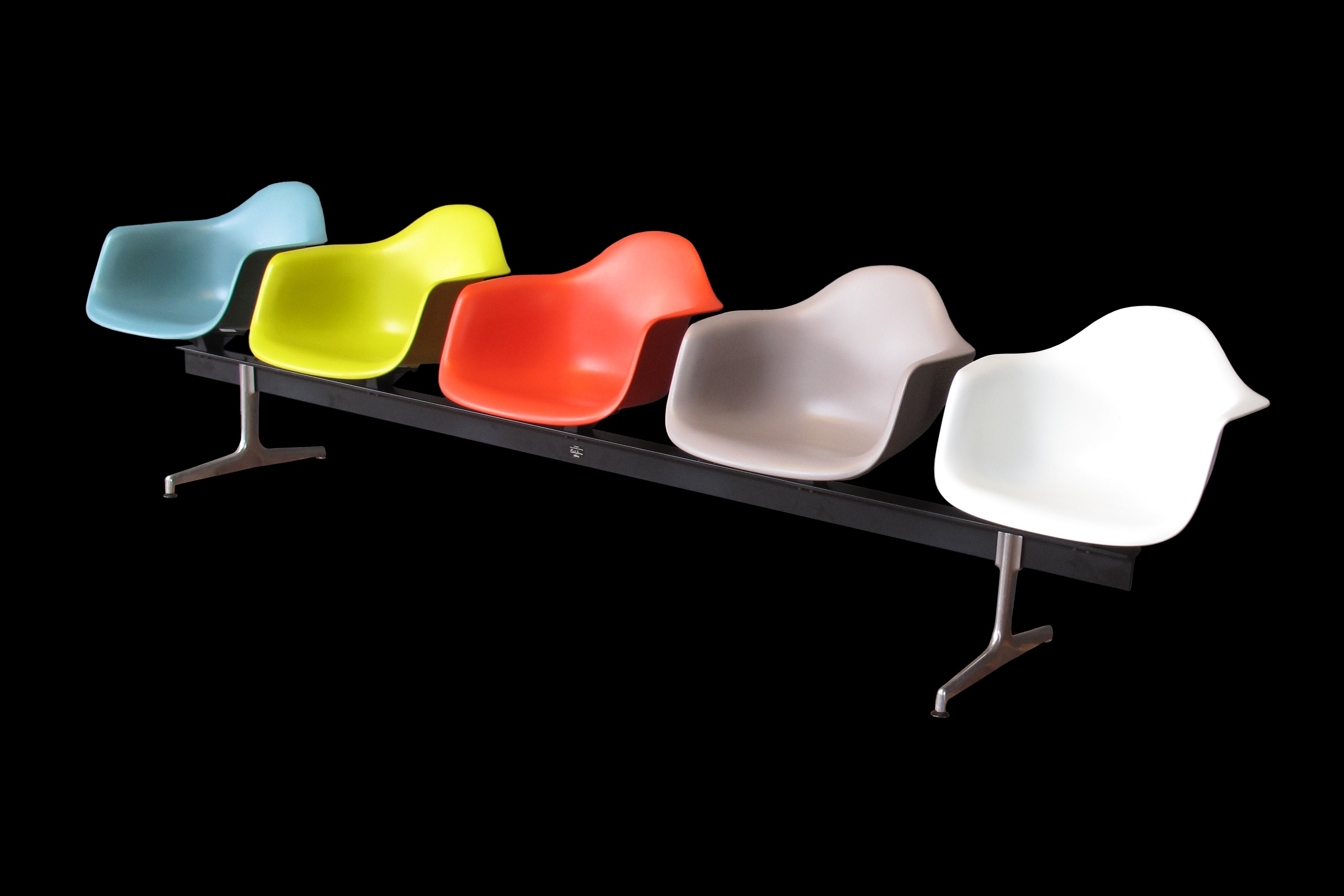
Fiberglass Armchair (bench variant often used in airports)

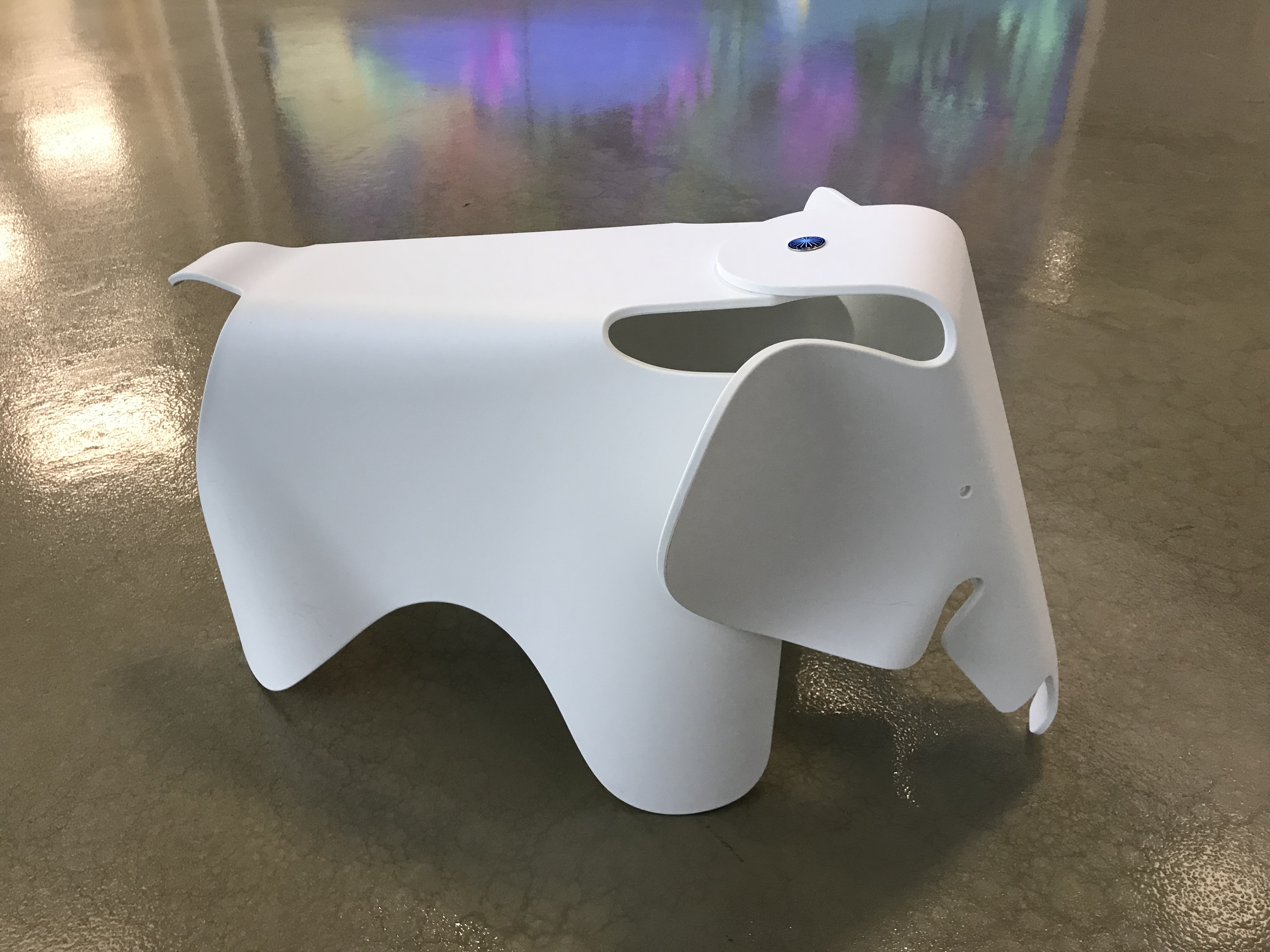
Elephant designed for the New Children's Hospital, Helsinki, Finland

=== Exhibition design ===
- Textiles and Ornamental Arts of India (1955)
- Glimpses of the USA (seven screens for the American exhibition in Moscow, Sokoolniki Park, 1959)
- Mathematica: A World of Numbers... and Beyond (IBM, 1961)
- IBM Pavilion at the 1964/1965 New York World's Fair
- Nehru: The man and his India (1965)
- The World of Franklin and Jefferson (1975) built for the US Bicentennial Commission, opened in Paris, traveled to five other countries and the US.

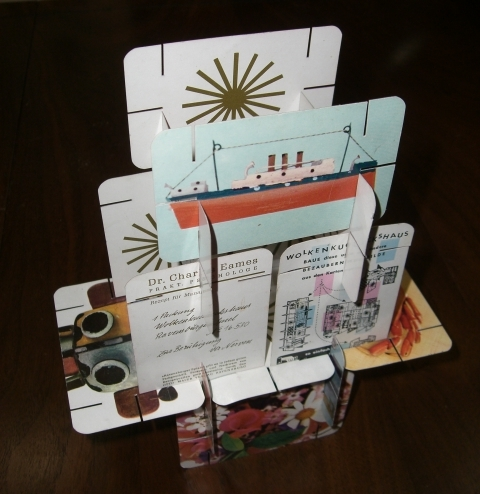
House Of Cards, German edition

=== Other ===
- Zenith 6D030 Z radio (1946)
- Emerson 578A radio (1946)
- Emerson 588A radio (1946)
- The Toy (1951)
- House Of Cards (1952)
- The Coloring Toy (1955)
- Stephens Speaker (1956)

== Deaths ==
Charles died on August 21, 1978, while visiting St. Louis, Missouri. Ray died on August 21, 1988, in Santa Monica, California.

Charles's daughter, Lucia Eames, inherited the Eames collections and Eames House. Although Charles did not concern himself with the future of their designs after his death, Ray actively planned the continuation of the Eames legacy during the last decade of her life. Lucia founded the Eames Foundation in 2004 to preserve and share the legacy of the Eames House with the public for future generations. Lucia Eames died in 2014, leaving her five children as the Board of Directors of the Eames Office and Eames Foundation. The Eames Office continues its work in educating and advocating for the legacy of the Eameses, which includes occasionally releasing previously un-produced Eames designs.

== Awards and recognition ==
- On June 17, 2008, the US Postal Service released the Eames postage stamps, a pane of 16 stamps celebrating the designs of Charles and Ray Eames.
- AIA Twenty-five Year Award, 1978
- Royal Gold Medal, 1979
- "The Most Influential Designer of the 20th Century" IDSA 1985
- ADC Hall of Fame, Charles Eames inducted in 1984, Ray Eames inducted in 2008
- First National Industrial Designers Institute Award, 1951
- First Annual Kaufmann International Design Award, 1960
- Museum of Science & Industry, Chicago, Illinois, Special Award, 1967
- United States Information Agency, Outstanding Service Award, 1976
- American Institute of Graphic Arts, Medalist Award, 1977
- Royal Institute of British Architects awarded Charles and Ray with the Royal Gold Medal, 1979
- Art Center College of Design, 50th Anniversary Award for Distinguished Lifetime Achievement, 1980

=== Contemporary exhibitions and documentaries ===
- Charles and Ray Eames, Design Museum, London, UK (1998)
- Kazam!, Library of Congress, US (May 20, 1999 – September 4, 1999) (Note: The LOC press release states that "The exhibit closes on Sept. 4, after which it will travel to the Cooper-Hewitt Design Museum in New York (Oct. 12, 1999 - Jan. 9, 2000), the St. Louis Art Museum (Feb. 9 - May 14, 2000) and the Los Angeles County Museum of Art (June 25 - Sept. 11, 2000). It has already been to Germany, Denmark and London.")
- Eames: The Architect and the Painter, film in the American Masters series (PBS documentary released November 18, 2011)
- The World of Charles and Ray Eames, Barbican Centre, London, UK (October 21, 2015 – February 14, 2016)
- Eames & Hollywood, Design Museum Brussels (March 10, 2016 – September 4, 2016)
- Charles & Ray Eames. The Power of Design, Vitra Design Museum, Weil am Rhein, Germany (September 30, 2017 – February 2, 2018)
- The World of Charles and Ray Eames, Oakland Museum of California, US (October 13, 2018 – February 17, 2019)

== See also ==
- National Institute of Design, Ahmedabad
- The India Report
- Pirouette: Turning Points in Design – 2025 exhibition at the Museum of Modern Art

== Bibliography ==
- Butler, Cornelia and Alexandra Schwartz eds. Modern Women: Women Artists at the Museum of Modern Art, pp. 220–224. New York: Museum of Modern Art, 2010.
- Caplan, Ralph, "Connections: The Work of Charles and Ray Eames". Los Angeles, California: University of California Los Angeles, 1976.
- Rago, David and John Sollo. Collecting Modern: a guide to mid-century furniture and collectibles. Gibbs Smith, 2001. (ISBN 1-5868-5051-2)
- Drexler, Arthur. "Charles Eames Furniture from the Design Collection of Modern Art, New York". New York: Museum of Modern Art, 1973. (ISBN 0-810-96028-1)
- Neuhart, Marilyn, Neuhart, John and Eames, Ray. Eames Design: The Work of the Office of Charles and Ray Eames. Abrahms, New York 1989. (ISBN 0-810-90879-4)
- Eisenbrand, Jochen. Ray Eames. Breuer, Gerda, Meer, Julia (ed): Women in Graphic Design, pp. 152–163 and 437. Berlin, Germany: Jovis 2012. (ISBN 978-3-86859-153-8)
- Kirkham, Pat. Charles and Ray Eames: Designers of the 21st Century. Boston, Massachusetts: MIT Press 1998. (ISBN 0-262-61139-2)
- Brandes, Uta Brandes. Citizen Office: Ideen und Notizen zu einer neuen Bürowelt. von Vegesack, Alexander (ed), Goettingen: Steidl Verlag, 1994. (ISBN 3-88243-268-3)
- Kunkel, Ulrike. Ray Eames: Design als Lebensform. Jürgs, Britta (ed) Vom Salzstreuer bis zum Automobil: Designerinnen, pp. 126–139, Berlin, Germany: AvivA Verlag 2002. (ISBN 3-932338-16-2) (de., eng.)
- Eames, Charles and Eames, Ray. Die Welt von Charles und Ray Eames. Berlin, Germany: Ernst & Sohn 1997. (ISBN 3-433-01814-6)
- Prouvé, Jean. Charles & Ray Eames. Die großen Konstrukteure – Parallelen und Unterschiede. Vitra Design Museum, Weil am Rhein 2002. (ISBN 3-931936-37-6) (de., frz., engl.).
- Demetrios, Eames. An Eames Primer. New York: Universe, 2002. (ISBN 0-7893-0629-8)
- Gössel, Peter (ed.) Koenig Gloria. Eames. Taschen, 2005. (ISBN 3-8228-3651-6)
- Albrecht, Donald. The work of Charles and Ray Eames: A Legacy of Invention. Harry N. Abrams in association with the Library of Congress and the Vitra Design Museum, 2005. (ISBN 0-8109-1799-8)
- Ostroff, Daniel, ed. (2015). An Eames Anthology: Articles, Film Scripts, Interviews, Letters, Notes, Speeches by Charles and Ray Eames. New Haven, Connecticut: Yale University Press. ISBN 978-0-300-20345-5.
- Kugler, Jolanthe. "Eames Furniture Sourcebook" Weil am Rhein, Germany Vitra Design Museum 2017.
