= Zoppi =

Zoppi is a surname. Notable people with the surname include:

- Antonio Zoppi (1860–1926), Italian painter
- Irene M. Zoppi (born 1966), United States Army Reserve officer
- Jimmy Zoppi (born 1954), American voice actor, voice director, pianist, and vocalist
