= Eames Lounge Chair Wood =

Chair designed by Charles and Ray Eames

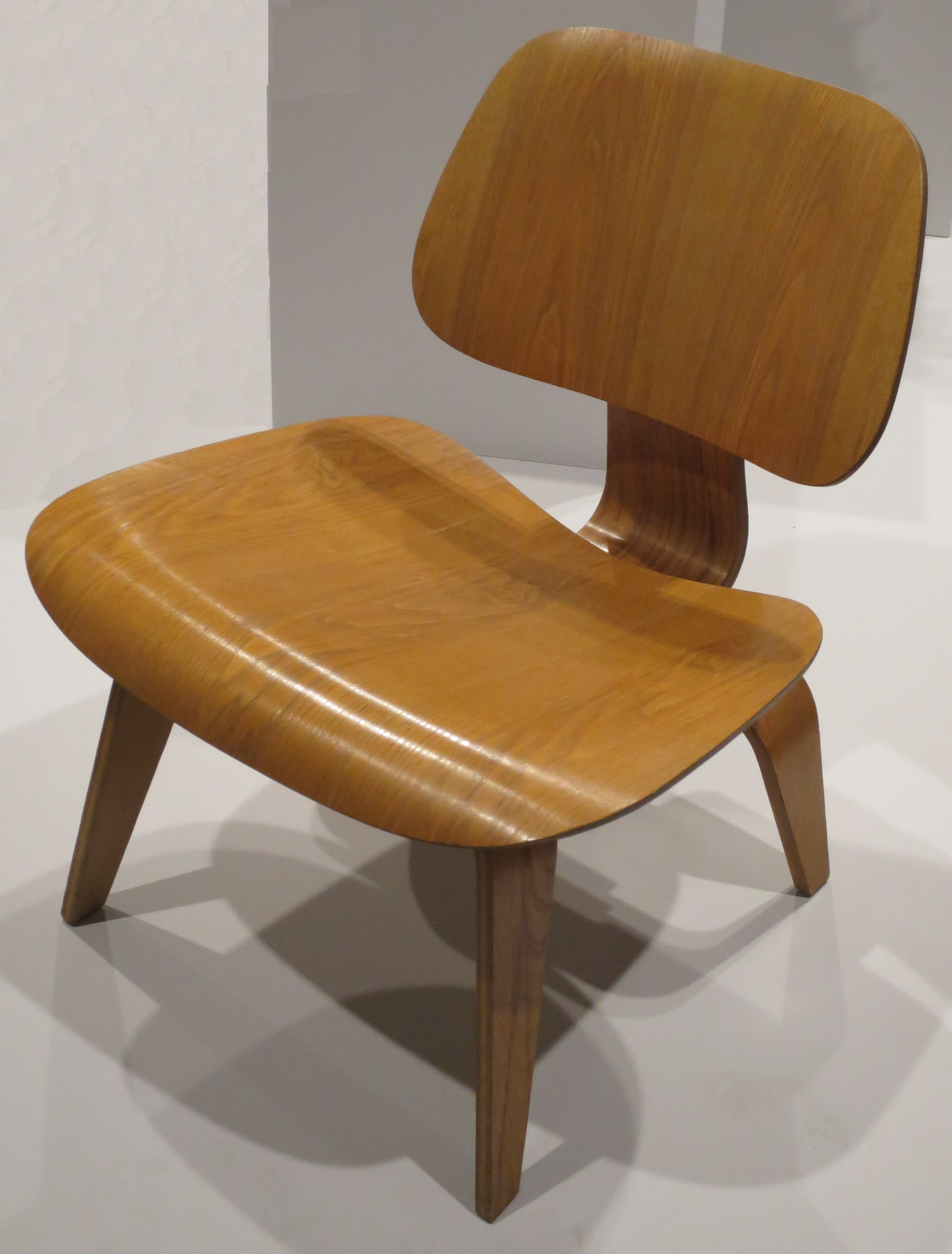
Eames Lounge Chair Wood (LCW) on display at the Honolulu Museum of Art

The Eames Lounge Chair Wood (LCW) (also known as Low Chair Wood or Eames Plywood Lounge Chair) is a low-seated easy chair designed by husband and wife team Charles and Ray Eames of the Eames Office.

The chair was designed using technology for molding plywood that the Eameses developed before and during the Second World War. Before American involvement in the war, Charles and his friend, architect Eero Saarinen, entered a furniture group into the Museum of Modern Art's "Organic Design in Home Furnishings Competition" in 1940, a contest exploring the natural evolution of furniture in response to the rapidly changing world. Eames & Saarinen won the competition. However, production of the chairs was postponed due to production difficulties and then by the United States' entry into World War II. Saarinen left the project due to frustration with production.

The Eameses moved to Venice Beach, Los Angeles, in 1941. Charles took a job as a set painter for MGM Studios to support them. Ray, formally trained as a painter and sculptor, continued experiments with molded plywood designs in the spare room of their apartment. In 1942, Charles left MGM to begin making molded plywood splints for the United States Navy. The splints used compound curves to mimic the shape of the human leg. The experience of shaping plywood into compound curves contributed significantly to the development of the LCW.

== Design development ==
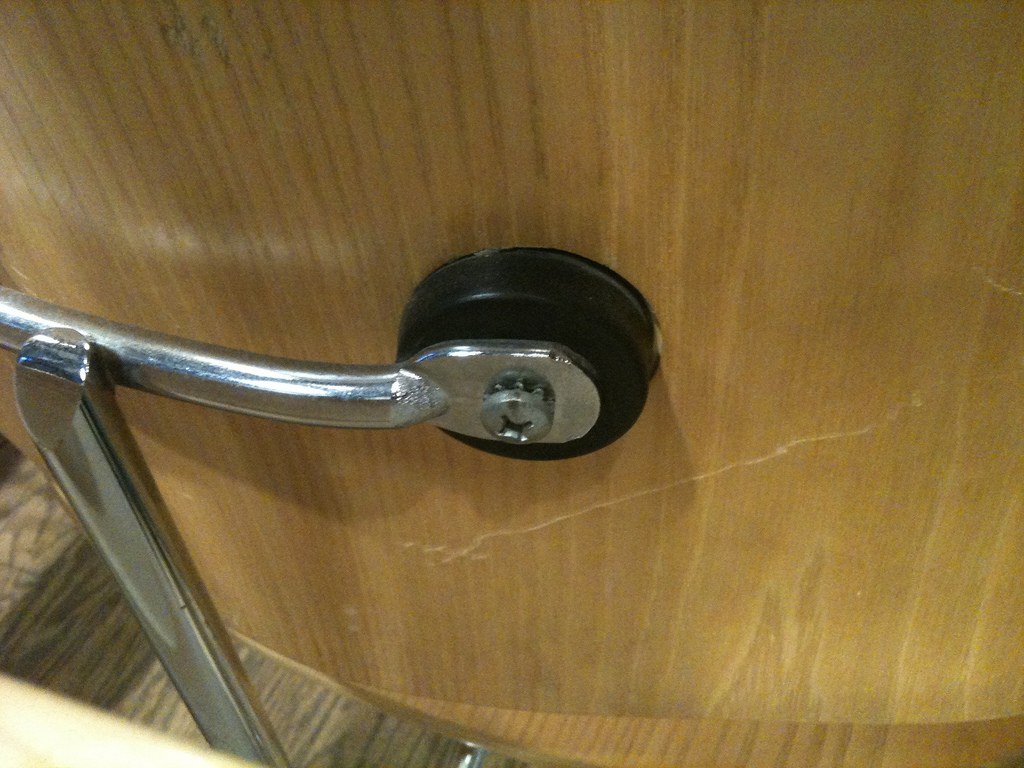
One of two shock mounts holding the back of the Lounge Chair Metal. The black rubber is glued to the wood; the bolt only connects the frame to a metal insert inside the mount. Three similar shock mounts support the seat.

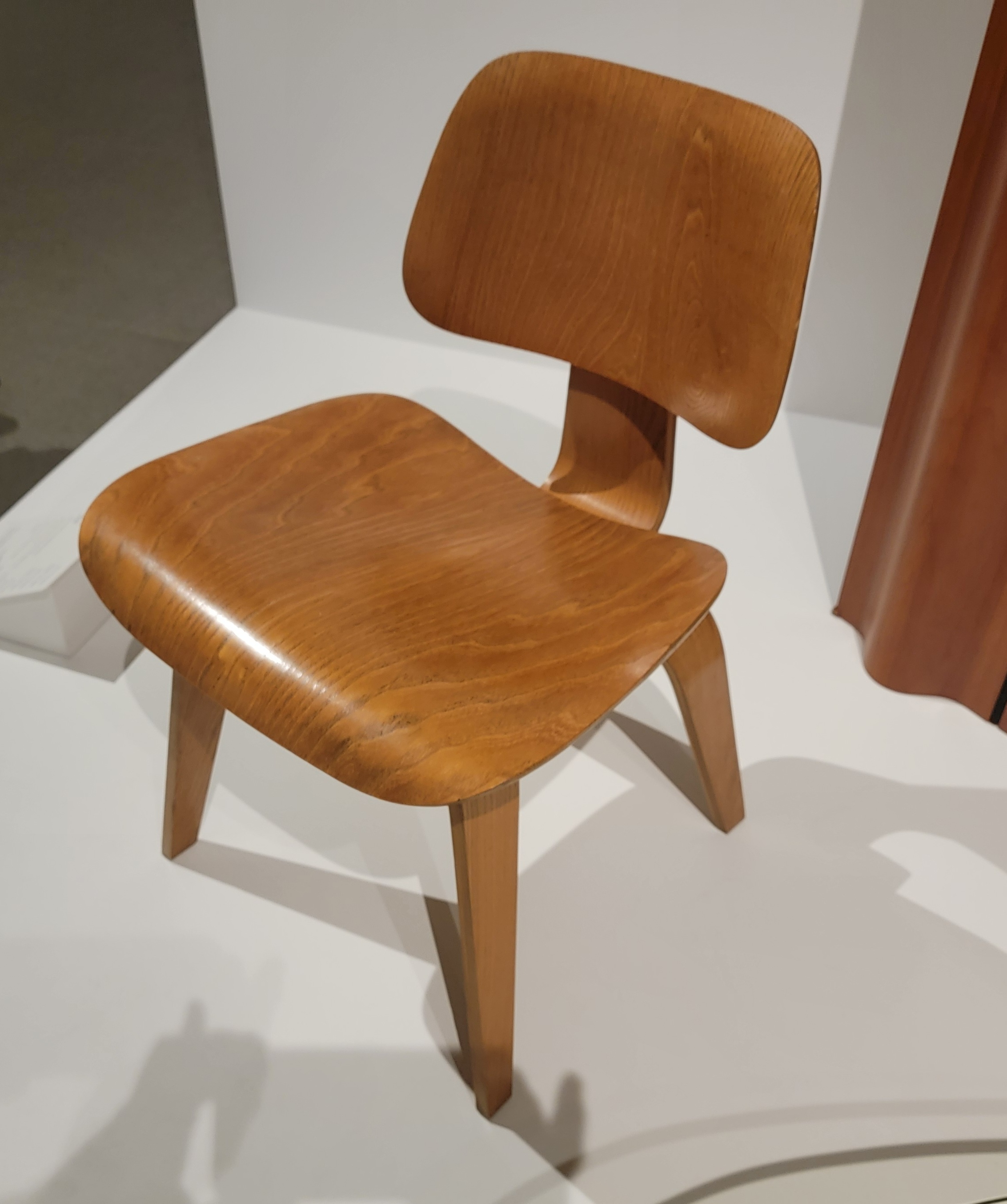
Eames LCW chair on display at the Oakland Museum of California

The entries Charles Eames & Eero Saarinen submitted to the Organic Furniture competition were designed with the seat and backrest joined in a single 'shell'. The plywood, however, was prone to cracking when bent into the sharp curves the furniture demanded. The competition entries were covered with upholstery to hide these cracks.

Through extensive trial and error, Charles and Ray arrived at an alternate solution: create two separate pieces for the seat and backrest, joined by a plywood spine and supported by plywood legs. The result was a chair with a sleek and honest appearance. All the connections were visible, and the material was not hidden beneath the upholstery. The seat was joined to the spine and legs with four heavy rubber washers, each with embedded nuts, subsequently referred to as 'shock mounts'. The shock mounts were glued to the underside of the seat and screwed in through the bottom of the chair. The backrest was also attached using shock mounts. From the front and top, the seat and back are uninterrupted by fasteners. The rubber mounts were pliable, allowing the backrest to flex and move with the sitter. This technology is also one of the chair's greatest flaws. The shock mounts are glued to the wooden backrest, but may tear free for various reasons. A common response to this problem was to drill directly through the backrest and insert fasteners between the backrest and the lumbar support. This devalues the chair, since it changes the original aesthetic of smooth, uninterrupted wooden forms.

Coming out of an era when furniture was heavy and complex, made from multiple materials, and then covered in upholstery, the Eames design was striking. The chair was produced from 1946 until 1947 by Evans Molded Plywood of Venice Beach, California, for the Herman Miller furniture company in Zeeland, Michigan. In 1947, Herman Miller moved the production of the chairs to Michigan, where production continues—after a hiatus from 1957 to 1994. In Europe, Vitra became the producer of Eames furniture. Herman Miller and Vitra are the only two companies producing chairs licensed by the Eames estate, as represented by the Eames Office.

== Museum collections ==
The LCW chair is held in the permanent collections of the San Francisco Museum of Modern Art, the High Museum of Art, the Denver Art Museum, the Victoria and Albert Museum, the National Museum of American History, the Carnegie Museum of Art, Museum of Arts and Design, New York, the Saint Louis Art Museum, the Minneapolis Institute of Art Museum, the Museum of Fine Arts, Houston, the Brooklyn Museum, among other collections.

== See also ==
- Eames Lounge Chair
