= Girolamo Zoppio =

Italian writer and scholar

Girolamo Zoppio (date unknown – 5 June 1591) was a 16th-century Bolognese writer. A street in Bologna and a lecture hall in the University of Bologna both bear his name.

== Life ==
He was born in Bologna, and began his career as a doctor and joined the medical faculty, where he assisted Vesalius in his dissections. His son, Melchiorre Zoppio, would follow him into a dual academic and medical career. In his spare time, Girolamo cultivated scholarship and philosophy, becoming a professor of both. He taught logic and morality for some years in Macerata, where he set up the Accademia di Catenati, which taught in Italian not Latin. He then returned to take up the chair in literature in Bologna, where he died.

Zoppio took an active part in the grammatical disputes that arose during his lifetime between the literary figures of Italy. He declared his support for Annibal Caro in the famous dispute begun by his famous canzone De gigli d'oro and was also one of the defenders of Petrarch and Dante. In this, he acted as a humanist with a love of the language of his birthplace. In Difesa del Petrarcha, one of his pamphlets, Zoppio fiercely attacked Girolamo Muzio. Fontanini pretended that this was because Muzio had said that philosophers were patriarchs to heretics, but he could not find any other reason for Zoppio's attack, stating that its heat was inseparable from all discussion. Love of ancient philosophy was in fact also a humanist trait.

== Works ==
1. the first four books of the Aeneid by Virgil, translated into Italian in ottava rima, Bologna, 1554, in-8;
2. Rime et prose, ibid., 1567, in-8° - the only prose piece in the work is his defence of the Canzone by Annibale Caro.
3. L'Atamante traged., Macerata, 1578, in-4°.
4. Ragionamenti in defensa di Dante e del Petrarcha, Bologna, 1583, in-4;
5. Risposta allé opposizioni sanesi, Fermo, in-4°;
6. Particelle poetiche sopra Dante, Bologne, in-4°;
7. La poetica sopra Dante, ibid., in-4° (see: la Bibliotheca of Fontanini, vol. 1, p. 349 and following.).

== Bibliography ==
- Piantoni, Luca (2012). "Un'«insolita moneta». Il Mida di Girolamo Zoppio (1573)". In Daria Perocco (ed.). Tra boschi e marine. Varietà della pastorale nel Rinascimento e nell'Età barocca. Bologna: Archetipolibri. pp. 233–269.
- Girolamo Zoppio, Il Mida, a cura di Luca Piantoni, Manziana, Vecchiarelli, 2017.
- Esposito, Enzo (1970). "Zoppio, Girolamo". Enciclopedia Dantesca. Rome: Istituto dell'Enciclopedia Italiana.

== Sources ==
- (in French) "Girolamo Zoppio", in Louis-Gabriel Michaud, Biographie universelle ancienne et moderne : histoire par ordre alphabétique de la vie publique et privée de tous les hommes avec la collaboration de plus de 300 savants et littérateurs français ou étrangers, 2nd edition, 1843–1865
