= Eames House =

Historic house in Los Angeles, California

- U.S. National Register of Historic Places
- U.S. National Historic Landmark
- Los Angeles Historic-Cultural Monument
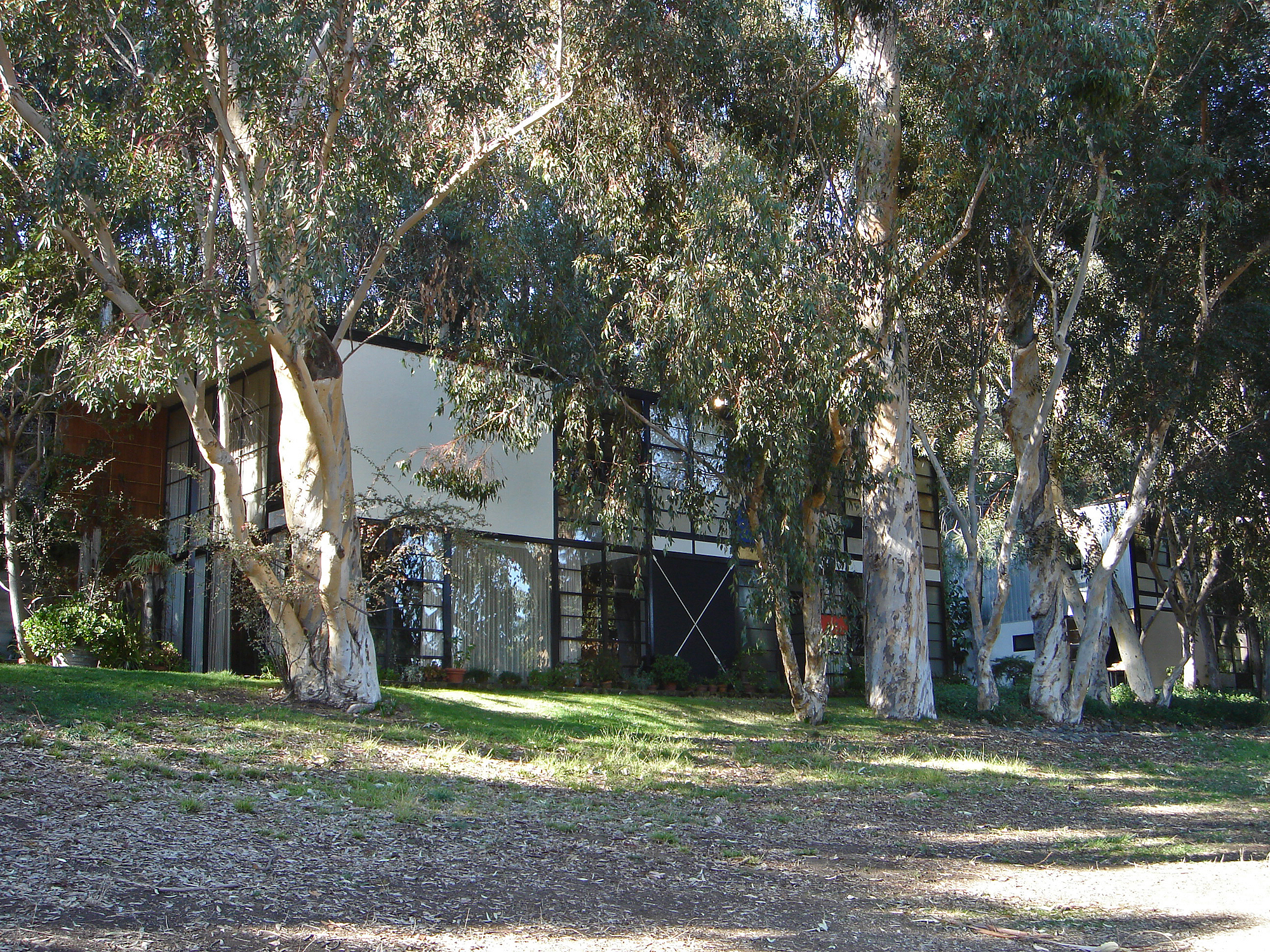

- Location within the Los Angeles metropolitan area Location within California Location within the United States
- Location: 203 Chautauqua Boulevard; Los Angeles, California, US
- Coordinates: 34°01′47″N 118°31′10″W
- Built: 1949
- Architects: Charles and Ray Eames
- Architectural style: Mid-century modern
- NRHP reference No.: 06000978
- LAHCM No.: 381

Significant dates
- Added to NRHP: 2006-09-20
- Designated NHL: 2006-09-20
- Designated LAHCM: 1988-07-15

The Eames House (also known as Case Study House No. 8) is a historic house museum at 203 Chautauqua Boulevard in the Pacific Palisades neighborhood of Los Angeles, California, United States. Designed in the mid-century modern style, the house was constructed in 1949 by Eames Office designers Charles and Ray Eames for themselves. It consists of two standalone rectangular pavilions—a residence and a standalone studio—both constructed of various materials. The Eames House has been operated by the nonprofit Charles & Ray Eames Foundation (originally the Eames Foundation) since 2004.

The house was developed as part of Arts & Architecture magazine's Case Study Houses program, announced by John Entenza in 1945. After Entenza acquired the site, the Eameses and Eero Saarinen initially proposed an elevated, L-shaped structure. Charles and Ray later revised the design to create two pavilions. Work began in 1948, and the frame was constructed in one-and-a-half days in 1949. Charles and Ray moved into the home on Christmas Eve in 1949 and lived there until their respective deaths: Charles's in 1978 and Ray's in 1988. They used it as a workspace and exhibited their belongings there. After Ray's death, Charles's daughter Lucia inherited the home. By the 2000s, visitors were allowed to tour the grounds, and in 2025, the studio pavilion's interior opened to the public.

The house spans about 2,500 square feet (230 m^{2}) across the residential and studio pavilions, which flank a central courtyard to the south and north, respectively. The pavilions occupy a hillside along the site's western boundary, while the rest of the site has trees and a meadow. The 17-foot-tall (5.2 m) facade is a steel grid with panels in different materials and colors. The residential pavilion's lower level features a living room, kitchen–dining room, and utility space, while its upper level holds two bedrooms and two bathrooms. The studio pavilion has a similar mezzanine with a kitchen, storage space, and studio room. The arrangement of the Eameses' possessions—such as furniture, toys, artwork, antiques, and decorative ornaments—is also a major element of the interior design.

When the Eames House was completed, it was covered extensively in the architectural press, and commentators praised the house for its technical advances and its role as a symbol of the Eameses' work. The house has inspired other architects, particularly those from Britain, and has been both the subject and setting of various media works, including exhibits and films. The house is a Los Angeles Historic-Cultural Monument and a National Historic Landmark.

== Site ==
The Eames House (a.k.a. Case Study House No. 8), the former residence of Charles and Ray Eames, is located at 203 Chautauqua Boulevard in the Pacific Palisades neighborhood of Los Angeles, California, United States. The property is variously cited as covering 1.4 acres (0.57 ha), 1.5 acres (0.61 ha), or 1.69 acres (0.68 ha). It occupies a bluff about 150 feet (46 m) above the Pacific Ocean. The surrounding topography is characterized by flat mesas, with unstable loose alluvium and marine shales, surrounded by canyons. The Eames House occupies a smaller mesa north of the Santa Monica Canyon.

=== Surroundings ===
The Eames House is one of four residences designed on the same city block for the Case Study Houses program. The block abuts Corona Del Mar and other property to the northwest, Chautauqua Boulevard to the northeast and southeast, and the Pacific Coast Highway to the southwest. The Entenza House, also known as Case Study House No. 9, is located at 201 Chautauqua Boulevard, to the east and less than 600 feet (180 m) away from the Eames House. To the northeast is Case Study House No. 20, a third house designed by Richard J. Neutra. The fourth house on the site, Case Study House No. 18, was designed by Rodney Walker and is located east of the Entenza House. The houses share the same general plot but are oriented to provide privacy to each residence. Writers John and Marilyn Neuhart said the Eames House had the best site on the block, as it was the closest to the Pacific Ocean.

The site was historically part of the homeland of the indigenous Tongva. The parcel was first settled under Mexican colonization in 1839, then acquired by Abbot Kinney in 1889, Collis Huntington in 1891, and the Chautauqua Association in 1921. The land was then sold to actor Will Rogers in 1927, becoming part of the vast Rogers estate. The adjacent parts of Rogers's estate became the Will Rogers State Historic Park.

=== Grounds ===
Planting consultant J. A. Gooch arranged the trees and shrubs on the house's grounds, in contrast with other Case Study houses, landscaped by Garrett Eckbo. The Eames property is accessed by a driveway from Chautauqua Boulevard, with signage for multiple houses. The driveway is paved in asphalt. The southern edge of this driveway has a fence and trees, while the northern edge has a curving brick wall abutting House 20.

The house itself consists of residence and studio pavilions separated by a central courtyard. The pavilions and courtyard are arranged in a straight line on the western boundary of the site, adjoining a hillside. A wooden walkway, originally made of railroad sleepers, leads to the eastern elevations of both pavilions' facades. An existing row of eucalyptus trees, planted in the 1880s by Abbot Kinney, was preserved east of this walkway. Another walkway leads behind the western elevations of both structures. The western elevations sit on an 8-foot-high (2.4 m) retaining wall along the hillside, which measures 9 inches (230 mm) thick and extends either 175 feet (53 m) or 200 feet (61 m). This wall extends at an angle past each pavilion.

The south patio, next to the residence

The house has a central courtyard and two patios (one each to the north of the studio and south of the residence). The patios and courtyard have vegetation and brick, marble, and wood floor surfaces, along with potted plants arranged by Ray. The south patio (or south court) sits beneath an overhanging roof eave and has three pilings salvaged from a demolished pier in Venice, Los Angeles. The floor of the south patio has a grid of wood planks, filled in with brick and scattered unpaved squares, a design feature also used in the courtyard and in the north patio. The courtyard has marble pavers outside a doorway to the studio pavilion, along with various pots. The north patio is L-shaped and leads to the house's carport, next to the driveway. There are plants and rocks between the patio and carport.

The rest of the property was less formally landscaped. The eastern portion has a meadow enclosed by an earthen berm; the pavilions' alignment, facing the meadow, allowed a greater contrast with the landscape compared with a site in the middle of the city. Before Charles and Ray built the house, the meadow had rye and wildflowers, which the couple rarely cut, even decades afterward. The meadow and trees host various birds and animals. Shrubs surround a berm (Note: The National Park Service cites this barrier as a metal fence rather than a mound.) separating the Entenza and Eames properties, which Charles felt was a successful landscape feature.

== History ==
=== Development ===
The house's original owners, Charles Eames and his wife Ray (nee Kaiser), were industrial designers who led the Eames Office. While primarily known for their furniture designs, the Eameses also designed a small number of buildings. Charles and Ray both had design backgrounds—Charles under architect Eliel Saarinen and Ray under artist Hans Hofmann—and met at the Cranbrook Academy of Art in Michigan in 1940. They were married the next year. The Eameses moved to Los Angeles in 1941 because, as Charles recalled, they wanted a quiet place to work. They became friends with John Entenza, publisher of Arts & Architecture magazine, who helped the Eameses find an apartment in Westwood, their residence for the next eight years. Entenza appointed the Eameses to Arts & Architecture's editorial board, and they cofounded the Plyformed Wood Company, a furniture firm.

The couple initially considered designing a Spanish-style house of their own in Santa Monica, California. The house they eventually built was part of the Case Study Houses program, announced in the January 1945 issue of Arts & Architecture magazine; The program, which ran until 1966, sought to develop inexpensive and efficient model homes to meet housing demand in the postwar United States. The first 13 Case Study houses, including the Eames House and the neighboring Entenza House, were developed together in the 1940s, while the other houses were developed incrementally. These houses were built on private lots across Southern California, rather than at expositions or on government-owned land as other demonstration houses had been, and were given a strict budget. The early Case Study houses tended to use wood, brick, concrete, and glass, although the Eames House had a steel frame despite ongoing steel shortages. Because the houses did not receive government subsidies, materials were either donated or, more commonly, bought at market value.

==== Land acquisition and early design ====
Entenza bought 5 acres (2.0 ha) in the Pacific Palisades from Rogers's family in January 1945; the site was, at the time, very sparsely populated. Entenza announced the first eight architectural teams shortly afterward, among them Charles Eames and Eero Saarinen. The team was tasked with designing houses for the Eames family (Case Study House No. 8) and Entenza himself (No. 9). Entenza set aside 3 acres (1.2 ha) of the Pacific Palisades site for houses 8 and 9, and another 2 acres (0.81 ha) for two other Case Study houses. From the outset, houses 8 and 9 were designed together. The northwestern boundary of House 8's site had an embankment, which sloped up toward a plain. North of the embankment was to be House 9. Furniture designer D. J. De Pree later recalled Charles saying that he liked the site's proximity to mountains, deserts, and ocean, and that "the silence of these great entities would bring wholeness to his life".

With the new location in hand, the Eameses decided to build in the International Style. The Eameses and Saarinen hired Edgardo Contini as the structural consultant for both houses. Charles, Ray, and Saarinen's initial conception for House 8 consisted of an L-shaped structure with interconnected residence and studio wings, thereby allowing the Eameses to combine their personal and work activities. The building was to be carried on stilts above the existing meadow at the bottom of the embankment. The studio was to be nestled into the slope, and the residential wing was to extend perpendicularly from the embankment above the meadow. Contini proposed a cantilevered footbridge between House 8's upper story and the meadow; as a result, the Eameses originally called their residence the Bridge House. The footbridge was to be the secondary entrance, while a spiral staircase under the residential wing would be the main entrance. The building's steel frame, though more expensive to fabricate and transport compared with wood, was projected to reduce labor costs substantially, from 50% to 33% of the total construction cost.

The plans for houses 8 and 9 were published in the December 1945 issue of Arts & Architecture magazine. In that article, the Eameses and Saarinen wrote that the two designs were inapplicable as "solutions of typical living problems". Charles and Saarinen also felt that the two houses would "aid as background for [the] life in work". House 8's original plan was similar to other cantilevered glass residences designed by Saarinen and Ludwig Mies van der Rohe. Entenza split his assemblage into six parcels, selling four in January 1946 and retaining ownership of the House 8 and 9 sites. Delivery of materials—particularly steel, of which both houses were made—was delayed for over two years, during which Case Study houses with wood frames were constructed. The delay in construction was also attributed to the Eames Office's tendency to contemplate a promising design for several years before execution. In any case, Charles and Ray held picnics in the meadow in the meantime, developing an affinity for the landscape.

==== Final design ====
The eastern elevations of the residence (foreground) and studio (background)

While House 9 was built to its original plan, House 8 ended up being completely redesigned. The reasons for the redesign are disputed. In November 1947, after the steel was delivered, Charles went to New York City where he saw a Museum of Modern Art exhibition on Mies's architecture. There, he may have seen plans for Mies's Farnsworth House, a similarly boxy International Style structure with an open-plan interior, outdoor terraces, elevated floor, and glass expanses. The similarities to the Farnsworth House may have prompted Charles to modify the design for their house; Charles, while impressed by the exhibition, recalled that it did not show him anything he had already seen. The Eameses also intimated that the high cost of steel made the original design inefficient. Other reasons cited for the changes included an appreciation for Mies's steel-pavilion designs and a desire to preserve the landscape.

As late as March 1948, images of the Bridge House plan were still being published in Arts & Architecture. The design received a construction permit in September 1948, but the Eameses were already working on a redesign, which was published the next month. This design involved only Charles and Ray Eames, without any input from Saarinen. Although Saarinen and Charles continued to collaborate on the Entenza House, Charles's voluminous photo collection did not depict Saarinen at House 8's site between 1946 and 1949. The Eameses typically created to-scale building models for their designs, but there is no documentation that this was done for the revised plan, likely because of the change in architect. Charles's architecture license was invalid in California, so the Eames Office hired Kenneth Acker, who focused entirely on drawing the detailed plans for the revised schemes; Acker left the Eames practice soon after completing them. Both Ray and Charles contributed drawings for the designs.

Arts & Architecture issues from February 1949 onward referred to House 8 as the "Case Study House for 1949", though other publications about the Case Study Houses continued referring to it as House 8. The house came to be commonly known as just the Eames House. Revised drawings were published in Arts & Architecture in May 1949. While the studio remained intact on the embankment, the residential wing was detached and realigned to be on axis with the studio, and the house no longer floated above the meadow like a Miesian design did. This plan freed up the meadow for open space and preserved existing eucalyptus trees. Conversely, it also required extending a retaining wall under the studio; excavation from the expanded retaining wall was moved to the site's northern boundary. The new plan, like the original, lacked a garage and swimming pool, which the Eameses did not need.

The revised design provided additional occupiable space below the embankment at no additional cost. Author Pat Kirkham said the new plan sought "maximum volume from minimum materials", and historian Beatriz Colomina said the reuse of existing materials typified the Eameses' view of design "as the arrangement of a limited kit of parts". One account has it that only one additional beam was required for the revised plan. However, the two plans deviated significantly, and John and Marilyn Neuhart wrote that the new plans included 22 vertical girders, which were longer than the 16 in the original plan.

==== Construction ====
The Eameses wanted to preserve the site's existing eucalyptus trees, but there was insufficient space west of the trees for the new house, which required excavating part of the site's western boundary. The site was cleared by late 1948, at which point work on the retaining wall may have started. This wall added $5,000 to the construction cost. (Note: Equivalent to $64,000 in 2025) A local firm, Lamport, Cofer, and Salzman, was hired for construction, and McIntosh & McIntosh as the Eames House's structural engineer. Workers handcrafted many of the house's materials, such as the Cemesto panels. Eames Office employee Don Albinson welded over 200 pieces of steelwork for the house, in addition to sliding door frames, spiral staircases, and some cabinets and furnishings. Two of his peers, Frederick Usher and Charles Kratka, also helped out. The Eameses had difficulties securing planning approval, and when Ray contacted a city inspector to thank him for approving the house, he said, "We decided it isn't a house. We don't know what it is."

The frame was erected in one and a half days. Sources disagree on the amount of labor expended on the project; some sources wrote that the steel frame took five men 16 hours to erect (i.e. 80 man-hours), while others wrote that 90 man-hours were required for the frame. The roof was similarly assembled by a single worker in three workdays. The short timeline, along with the mass-produced nature of the materials, immediately garnered notice from around the world. The total cost of the house was never documented, but Charles's grandson Eames Demetrios estimated that it was "on the low range for a standard house". The Eameses paid for the house in part using royalties from their Eames Lounge Chair Wood design.

The Eameses moved into the house on December 24, 1949. The house, with all its furnishings, was published in that month's issue of Art & Architecture. The magazine wrote that the Eames House was "actually a kind of experience that once come upon is very likely to at least rearrange a number of the spectator's ideas". All the Case Study houses were opened to the public for several weeks when finished. The first eight Case Study houses attracted an estimated 350,000 or 360,000 people in six months.

=== Charles and Ray Eames use ===
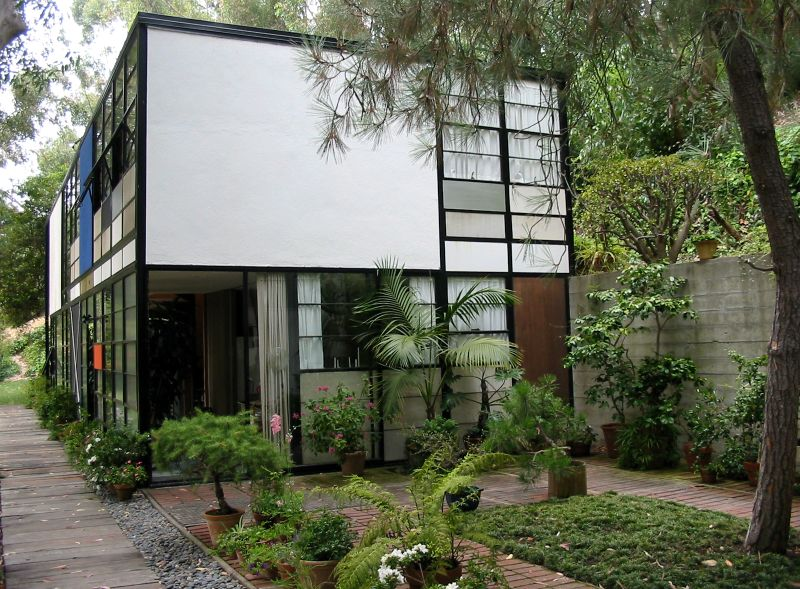
The Eames House's residence seen from the studio

The Eameses had no children or pets together while they lived at the house. Charles's only daughter from his previous marriage, Lucia, was in college by the time the house was built, though Lucia slept in a guest bedroom when she visited. The Eames House was small enough that the Eameses needed only to hire part-time staff, delegating day-to-day maintenance to a gardener and housekeeper. More complex fixes were handled by a maintenance manager (initially Don Albinson), who was responsible for such tasks as repainting, fixing leaky roofs, cleaning windows, and replacing damaged finishes and fixtures. The house was so remote that the Eameses received all mail at their office. Charles said the house had functioned so well that he forgot his role in designing it, and he enjoyed the comforts of the nearby ocean. Ray said in 1962 that "the structure long ago ceased to exist. I am not aware of it."

Charles and Ray initially used the studio as a home office, especially for their furniture design and filmmaking activities. The studio never became their main office and instead served a variety of purposes. In the 1950s, the couple used the studio for filmmaking, shooting several films such as Toccata for Toy Trains (1957). The couple also frequently brought their own furniture designs home for experimentation and display, such as an Eames Lounge Chair in the living room. Artwork and objects in the living room were constantly rearranged and replaced while the Eameses worked on designs there. Many images show the Eameses sitting on the floor, with their designs around them. The house was also used for photoshoots and advertising campaigns from 1950 onward.

Whenever the Eameses had guests, Ray greeted them and prepared table settings while Charles presented his current work. Among the events they hosted was a 1951 tea ceremony for their friend Isamu Noguchi and his wife Yoshiko Yamaguchi, with attendees including Charlie Chaplin, Ford Rainey, and Iris Tree. The house also hosted business meetings, such as a 1967 luncheon with executives of the Herman Miller furniture company and another lunch with IBM employees in 1973. The design attracted large numbers of architects and Eames fans as well. Architects such as Saarinen, Kevin Roche, Alison and Peter Smithson, Denise Scott Brown, Robert Venturi, Norman Foster, and Richard Rogers came over while the Eameses lived there. Students and architectural tourists were also invited inside. The Los Angeles Times wrote that the residence was "in all the architectural books, almost never in social columns".

==== Modifications ====
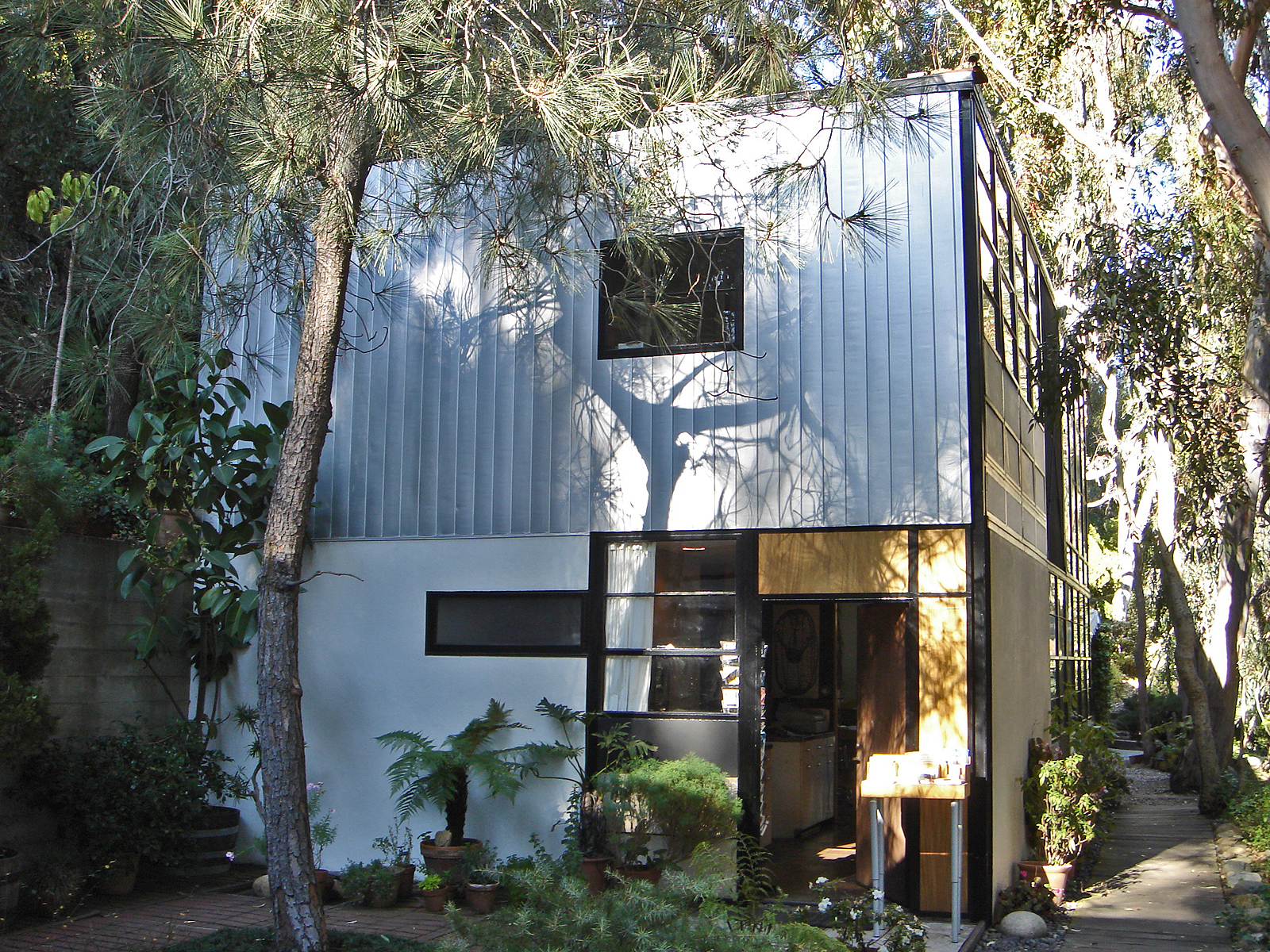
The Eames Studio became a guesthouse after the Eames Office moved out in 1958.

After the house was completed, it began to corrode due to its proximity to the ocean. Water pooled on the roof because of insufficient drainage and, during rainstorms, would cascade over the facade, causing water damage over time. This caused the studio's floor tiles to buckle and required brass hardware to be replaced with stainless steel. An earthquake in the 1950s also cracked one of the studio's wire-glass doors. By 1958, the Eames Office had relocated the studio's activities to the Herman Miller office at 901 Washington in Venice, California, as the studio pavilion had become too small for their work. The studio was reconfigured to accommodate Charles's grandchildren overnight, and the Eameses added objects such as cardboard boxes and a rope hanging from the ceiling. Charles's grandchildren recalled enjoying the studio and running around the surrounding meadow.

After Albinson quit the Eames Office in 1959, another Eames employee, Richard Donges, became the house's maintenance manager for the next two decades. Donges estimated that he made repairs at the house two to three times weekly. The Eameses, particularly Ray, were reluctant to deviate from the original design, even to replace damaged design details. For example, cracked floor tiles and the broken wire-glass studio door were not replaced because the respective materials were no longer being manufactured, and the heating system was never repaired after it broke. One story has it that Charles, in response to a query about the house's heating system, pointed to his sweater. The drainage issue was also never sufficiently repaired, though the Eameses did install a television antenna and a sprinkler system later on.

Charles lived at the house until his death in 1978. Afterward, Ray largely stopped swapping out the living room's furnishings, preserving the room as it appeared during Charles's lifetime. For the rest of her life, Ray slept in the studio's upper story, although contemporary media characterized the studio as a guesthouse. She continued to host architects, students, and tourists for visits. When Donges departed the Eames Office in 1979, he was succeeded by Sam Passalacqua as the house's maintenance manager. Ray outlived her husband by exactly ten years, dying in 1988. In her will, Ray had bequeathed the Eames House and other Eames properties to Lucia while specifying that the house be preserved.

=== Later use ===
==== 1990s and 2000s ====
The house was renovated in 1989.

The design was largely unchanged after Ray's death, in part because the Eames family aimed to preserve as much of the original architecture as they could. The studio pavilion became the Eames Office's new headquarters after Lucia sold the office's old 901 Washington building. The sale of the studio, and of some of the Eameses' archives, allowed Lucia to raise money for the house's restoration. Lucia and her husband Aristides Demetrios repaired the house over six months in 1989. The renovations were completed that August, but the house was not yet open to the public. The public rarely even saw the house unless they were involved in the architectural field or a family friend.

After the renovation, Lucia lived in the studio for a year; even after moving away, she occasionally returned to Los Angeles for visits, sleeping in the residence. By 1991, one of Charles's grandsons lived at the house. During the 1994 Northridge earthquake, several of the glass panes and objects inside were cracked. The Eames Office continued to occupy the studio in the late 1990s and early 2000s, ultimately using the studio for 15 years. The Eames family established the Eames Foundation in 2004, and the foundation took over ownership of the house, moving its offices into the studio.

By the 2000s, the grounds were open to the public by appointment, (Note: In 2003, The New York Times wrote that the Eames Office had allowed visitors to take self-guided tours of the grounds for several years. Another New York Times source wrote that the grounds opened in 2005, the year after the Eames Foundation took over.) although the site was still difficult to access. The interiors remained closed except on June 20 of each year, when the foundation gave tours to its members, and occasional public tours. The interiors, which remained as the Eameses had decorated them, were easily visible from outside. The windows were left open to allow visitors easier views of the interiors, though this hastened the deterioration of interior decorations. To raise money for the house's upkeep, the Eames Foundation sold Eames chairs, and by the late 2000s, the foundation was also fundraising for repairs. The foundation also sought to prune the landscape, where trees had grown haphazardly over the years.

==== 2010s to present ====
In 2011, the Eames Foundation hired Los Angeles architectural firm Escher GuneWardena to develop a plan for the house. Due to water damage in the living room, the vinyl asbestos floor there was replaced. After the living room's decorations were temporarily exhibited at the Los Angeles County Museum of Art, the Eames Foundation contacted the Getty Conservation Institute (GCI) for help renovating the room. GCI agreed to help preserve the house, designating it as the pilot project in GCI's newly-created Conserving Modern Architecture initiative. The next year, GCI began working on a long-term preservation plan for the house, and GCI pledged about $250,000 for research work. To raise additional funds for preservation, the Eames Foundation hosted a tea ceremony, and it auctioned off prints to receive matching funds from furniture firms Herman Miller and Vitra. Getty distributed a $100,000 grant for the house's preservation in 2015.

Although Charles and Ray intended that the landscape would change color between seasons, the 2011–2017 California drought damaged the landscape. Lucia Atwood, the Eames Foundation's director and one of Charles's granddaughters, said in 2017 that the meadow "has not been green for several years". GCI and the Eames Foundation published the house's preservation plan in April 2019. The plan, which followed six years of research, was accompanied by a report over 200 pages long. That October, the house was temporarily closed due to the Getty Fire. Atwood was by then raising funds to add a cistern to the grounds, since the area's wildfire risk had worsened over the years. The museum bought an original Eames-designed cabinet from a Michigan family in 2021 for $48,000, then the highest price ever paid for an Eames-designed cabinet. The Eames family felled the trees around the house in 2024.

The house narrowly survived the Palisades Fire in January 2025, which destroyed much of the Pacific Palisades and came within 150 feet (46 m) of the property. The house was covered in soot, fire retardant, and branches, but Artnet credited the previous year's tree-felling with having saved the house. After the fire, the meadow was used as a gathering place for displaced local residents, and the Eames Foundation restored the house based on the 2019 report. The house reopened that July after restorations, and the Eameses' studio was opened to the public for the first time. By then, the museum had 15,000 annual visitors.

== Architecture ==
The house seen from behind the row of eucalyptus trees

The Eames House is designed in the mid-century modern style. It is among the few building designs completed by Charles and Ray Eames before they stopped practicing architecture by the mid-1950s, and it was their only major architectural design. The Eames House is also one of the few Case Study houses built for its designers' own occupancy. Charles, who had an architectural background, was the architect of record and is generally named as the house's main architect. Ray was also involved in both the original and final designs and was responsible for the interior arrangements. Later scholarship credits Ray equally with her husband as co-designer of the Eames House. Kenneth Acker, a temporary employee of the Eames Office, is sometimes credited as a consulting architect. Eero Saarinen was credited as an architect for the original 1945 plan, but was not involved in the final design; the 1945 plan is sometimes credited to Charles and Saarinen alone.

Unlike other modernist architects, Charles avoided using curved design decorations, instead designing the residence and studio pavilions as rectangular prisms. One writer said the use of simple rectangular shapes was "just the kind of box Frank Lloyd Wright (and presumably [Charles] Eames as a student) decried". Though the structures have similar massings to Bauhaus designs, they are less spartan. The pavilions' locations, integrated with the hillside, were in keeping with ideals of organic architecture, contrasting with other Eames designs (including the original Bridge House plans) that ignored the landscape. The house's design drew comparisons to Japanese architecture and the steel-and-glass boxes of Ludwig Mies van der Rohe. The use of Japanese motifs, such as tatami-like grids, recalled similar designs by Wright, whom Charles had idolized as a young designer.

The Eames House also uses many mass-produced industrial materials, which were also highly modular, because, as Ray said, they wanted a design "that people would not have to build stick by stick". These materials were arranged specifically to accommodate the couple's lifestyle and work; when the house was built, the use of industrial components was not yet common in residential construction. Other parts of the house were custom-manufactured. Charles's grandson Eames Demetrios wrote that the design shared many themes with the Eameses' furniture pieces, including the "guest/host relationship, the honest use of materials, universalizing from the specific, and, above all, the learn-by-doing process".

=== Exterior ===
The central courtyard is flanked by the residence to the south and the studio to the north, both of which are two stories high. The pavilions both rest on concrete foundations. The front (eastern) and side (northern and southern) elevations measure 17 feet (5.2 m) high on the front. The rear (western) elevation is tucked into the landscape's slope and is placed atop the site's 8-foot-high (2.4 m) retaining wall, partially insulating the two pavilions. The narrower side elevations of both pavilions are organized vertically as a single bay measuring 20 feet (6.1 m) wide. On the pavilions' wider elevations, the residence is 51 feet (16 m) long, and the studio is 37 feet (11 m) long. These elevations are divided lengthwise into eight bays in the residence, four in the courtyard, and five in the studio, each measuring about 7.5 feet (2.3 m) across. (Note: Varying widths are given for the bays: 7 feet 4 inches (2.24 m); 7 feet 6 inches (2.29 m)) One of the residence's bays was created by extending the roof eave above the south patio.

==== Facade panels ====
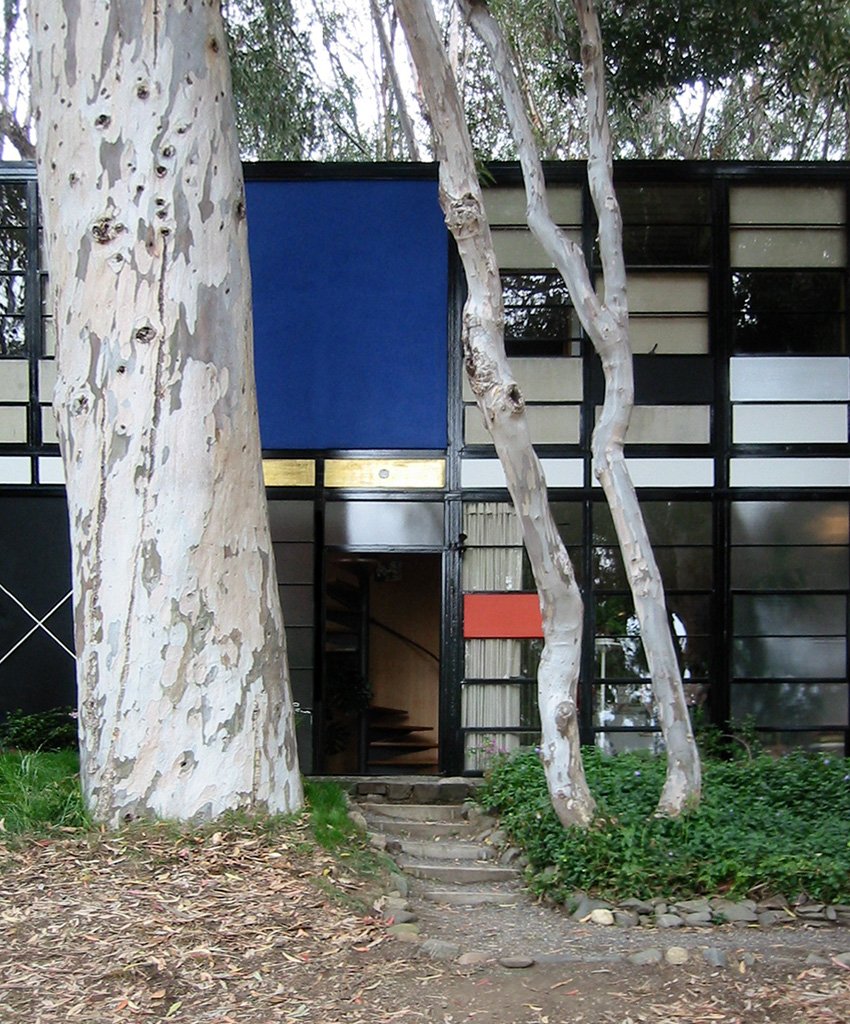
The entry door to the Eames House

In designing the house's exterior, Charles Eames wanted to enclose as much space with the materials available. The wider elevations' bays are separated by 4-inch-thick (100 mm) steel H-columns, which are spaced in two parallel rows 20 feet (6.1 m) apart (one on each elevation). (Note: McCoy 1977, p. 59, gives a different distance of 18 feet (5.5 m).) Each pair of columns is joined at the roof, and alternating pairs of columns are tied together internally by joists 8 feet (2.4 m) above ground. The steel frame is reinforced by diagonal metal cables, which are exposed on the eastern elevation and hidden behind the western elevation. The rear walls are paneled with wood and have some windows. All metalwork was originally painted a neutral gray, which helped protect the frame from corrosion. At some point, the metalwork was repainted black. Because of its geometric appearance, the Eameses likened the facade's frame to a web and a jungle gym.

The vertical beams and horizontal mullions frame a grid of rectangular panels. Charles and Ray extensively researched the materials used in these panels. As built, the panels are made of materials such as glass, aluminum, stucco, asbestos, or Cemesto. Due to decay, some of the original Cemesto panels have been replaced with similar-looking materials or plywood. Panels may be filled with a single rectangular material or subdivided into smaller panels made of multiple materials. Each panel may be subdivided horizontally into two courses and vertically into up to six or seven sub-bays. Some of the larger stucco panels are two bays wide.

The panels are in different colors, including red, blue, black, white, and beige. Charles intended for the colors to function visually as structural elements, contrasting with the gray frame. The colored panels were also intended to signify the activities taking place inside, and the grayscale panels in particular were intended to complement the eucalyptus trees facing the house. The Eameses used department-store paint from Sears, Roebuck and Company so the colors could be changed if the Eameses did not like them, though in practice, the panels were seldom repainted.

==== Doors, windows, and roof ====
The front door is in the northern half of the residence pavilion's eastern elevation and was intentionally kept nondescript. This door has five translucent panels and is topped by two gold Cemesto panels. There is a ceramic bell to the right, which is sometimes attributed to Maria Martinez. Both pavilions have additional sliding doors on their north and south elevations. These sliding doors were intended to integrate the interior and exterior spaces, and they also provide cross-ventilation. Next to the studio pavilion's northern elevation is a carport, which can fit one car and has a canvas awning on a metal frame.

The windows are arranged irregularly to maximize views of the surrounding landscape. The residence and studio both have fixed and movable casement windows. Transparent or translucent windows and doors are present in large quantities on all except the western elevations. The studio has wire-reinforced glass interspersed with transparent panels. Translucent Factrolite panels are installed at the entrance, bathrooms, and dining room. On the pavilions' western elevations are casement windows abutting the two-story sections, and windowless walls abutting the double-height one-story spaces. The western elevations are shielded by awnings and have a greater quantity of opaque panels than the other elevations, along with mechanical equipment. All windows are embedded into the metal grid, in contrast to contemporary glass-clad houses by Mies and Philip Johnson, where the architects wanted to create the illusion of blended interior and exterior spaces.

The roofs of both pavilions use steel decking, similar to materials used inside. Except above the bathrooms, the roof deck is made of Ferroboard steel panels supported by joists, which measure 12 inches (300 mm) thick. The roof surface is covered in white gravel. Each roof has a curb at its perimeter, which drains out onto gutters on the western elevation.

=== Interior ===
The house has about 2,500 square feet (230 m^{2}) in total, split into 1,500 square feet (140 m^{2}) in the residence and 1,000 square feet (93 m^{2}) in the studio. The upper story of both pavilions is present only in the section adjoining the courtyard, while the remainder of each structure is one double-height story. The interiors are laid out as a series of smaller spaces leading to more expansive rooms, an adaptation of Frank Lloyd Wright's compression and release philosophy. The Eameses wanted the interiors to be multipurpose spaces integrated with the outdoors. At the same time, the couple also wanted the interior to be welcoming to guests, since they anticipated that the house would be used for extensive collaborations. One observer said the design was oriented toward "shared experiences", as the Eameses' furniture designs also were.

Rooms are delineated by wood-framed partitions and lit by standalone lamps or by lights mounted onto the ceilings and walls. Ceilings are made of Ferroboard steel, which is generally exposed and painted white in double-height spaces, and covered with other materials in single-story spaces. The Eames House was built with a barebones electrical and mechanical system. The couple rarely used the forced-air heating system that came with the house, which incorporated underfloor heating ducts.

Charles and Ray collected a wide variety of items such as furniture, toys, artwork, antiques, and decorative ornaments, many of which were gifted by friends, family members, and peers. Charles designed the living room in a plain manner, and the furnishings themselves were comparatively ordinary. The interiors' special interest came primarily from Ray's arrangement of the items, which were grouped idiosyncratically. The original decorations in the living room included pillows, tatami mats, folk and Abstract Expressionist art, tapestries, books, seashells, paper lanterns, and Native American baskets. Paintings were hung from the ceiling, oriented face-down. Similarly diverse objects were exhibited in other rooms, such as the kitchen, and a painting by Ray was hung in the stairs. While some objects remained in the same place for decades, others were frequently relocated. The Eameses also kept potted plants inside and often rotated out pieces of their own furniture. Many of the furnishings remain on display.

==== Residence ====
The residence has a living room, dining room–kitchen, and two bedrooms, split across two stories to the north and one double-height story to the south. Immediately inside the main entrance is a spiral staircase connecting both floors. This staircase has pipe handrails, steel brackets bolted to a pipe column, plywood treads above each bracket, and open risers. The stair is lined with plywood walls, a feature Charles came to see as incongruous with the rest of the design. A skylight is placed in the ceiling immediately above the staircase.

Extending to the right (north) of the staircase—within the lower level of the residence building's northern section—is the residence's kitchen–dining room. The dining section to the south and the kitchen section to the north can be separated by a foldable partition, although the Eameses never used the partition. The kitchen has marble-and-steel counters and metal cabinets, along with a refrigerator. The stair's plywood wall continues along the kitchen's south wall, and a sliding door exits onto the central courtyard. A second door to the west, made of wood, leads to the courtyard. There is also a utility room next to the kitchen, behind a corrugated translucent panel, which has a washer, dryer, and heater. These spaces are illuminated by recessed can lights.

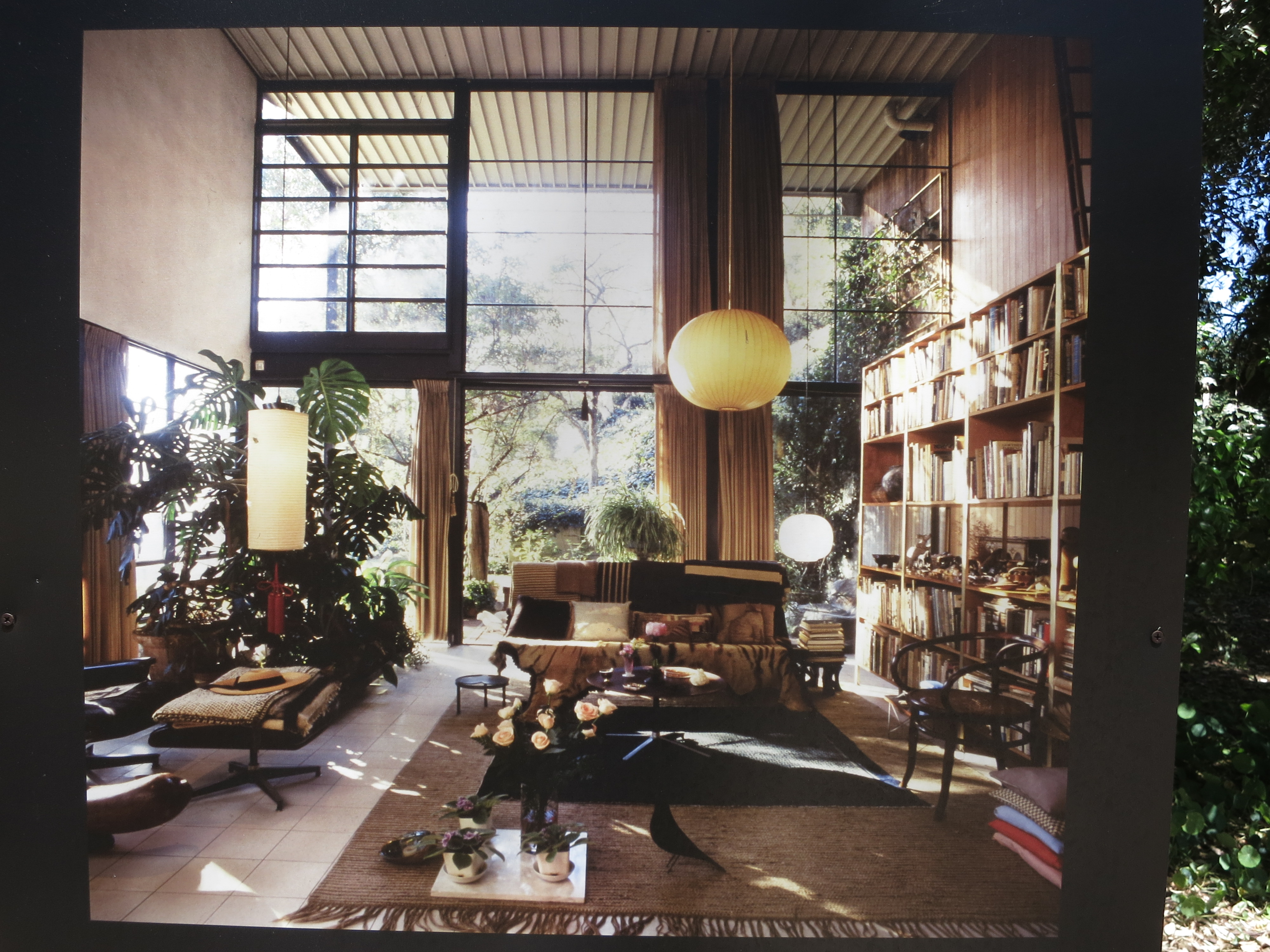
Living room interior

A small hallway with built-in storage space leads left (south) of the staircase; the storage space has prefabricated metal sliding doors. The south hallway leads to the living room, which measures 23 by 20 feet (7.0 by 6.1 m) across and occupies the double-height space at the residence pavilion's southern end. It has a one-story seating alcove, which contains cabinets, a shelf, and an L-shaped sofa. The living room and hallway floors were originally bare concrete, which was replaced with tiles by 1955; (Note: The original floors were variously cited as being made of asbestos. linoleum, or rubber. They have been made of vinyl since 2012.) the seating alcove's floor is covered with a carpet. The seating niche has rosewood paneling and a pass-through opening to the kitchen. The walls are covered with wood and stiffened canvas; the west wall's wooden paneling continues outside onto the patio. The metalwork is painted gray to resemble the trees outside. The living room has beige draperies and a movable window near the upper part of the room. A sliding door exits to the south patio. A ladder ascends to the ceiling, where the Eameses hung objects such as artwork and lamps.

The upper story has a hallway with additional storage built in. Two bedrooms, a dressing niche, and two bathrooms are on the upper story above the kitchen and dining room. These spaces have linoleum-tiled floors, wood-paneled walls, gooseneck-shaped light sconces on the walls, and sliding fiberglass windows. Although the bedrooms occupy a balcony overlooking the living room, they are not readily visible from downstairs. Sliding wood partitions can seal the bedrooms from each other and from the living room; when they are open, they conceal a closet in the smaller bedroom. The dressing niche is located at the rear and is arranged around two freestanding closets. Next to it is a large bathroom for Ray, with a checkerboard-patterned linoleum floor and a bathtub. A smaller bathroom for Charles leads off one of the bedrooms, with a shower, sink, and toilet; it originally had a sea-sand-colored floor. Both bathrooms have Micarta paneled walls and—in contrast with the rest of the house—maple ceilings.

==== Studio ====
The studio has a studio and loft, split across two stories to the south and one double-height story to the north. Compared with the residence pavilion, the studio has fewer rooms and simpler finishes. The southeastern corner of the ground level has a kitchenette facing the courtyard, which has a sink and cabinets. Abutting it are a bathroom and a hallway, along with an enclosed storage room (originally a darkroom) in the southwestern corner. The northern half of the lower level has a studio room, which has sliding doors on its north wall. The ground story mostly has parquet wood floors, except in the bathroom, where rubber tiles are used. The wood floors were installed in the late 1950s above the original exposed concrete slab, when the Eameses began hosting Charles's grandchildren overnight.

Connecting to the upper level is a steel staircase with pipe handrails, wood treads, and open risers; before the staircase was installed, a ladder connected the two floors. There is also an opening in the upper level for objects to be hoisted up and down. The second story is used as a loft, with a bedroom and workspace. The floor is variously cited as being made of linoleum or rubber tile.

== Management ==
The Eames House is operated by the Charles & Ray Eames Foundation. The house is open five days a week by reservation, and the foundation allows self-guided visits to the grounds, private tours of the interior, and events. Prior to 2025, none of the interior spaces could be accessed. The interior of the studio has been open to the public since 2025, but the residence's interior remained closed.

=== Eames Foundation ===
The Eames Foundation was established in 2004 and is designated as a 501(c)(3) nonprofit. Led by Charles's daughter Lucia Eames, it was originally officially known as just the Eames Foundation. Lucia died in 2014, leaving her five children as the board of directors. The foundation was led solely by Eames family members until 2025, when it was officially rebranded as the Charles & Ray Eames Foundation. As of 2026, the foundation was led by Adrienne Luce.

Following the Eames Foundation's 2025 rebranding, its scope was expanded to include the Eameses' other designs, incorporating educational and cultural programs originally overseen by the Eames Office. The expanded Eames Foundation oversees the operation, conservation, and restoration of the house and the Eameses' other works. The foundation also hosts exhibits, workshops, and art on the property.

== Impact and legacy ==
The house was covered significantly in the architectural press.

The Eames House has been covered significantly in the architectural press and has inspired the design of other structures. Pat Kirkham wrote that the Eames House received disproportionate coverage among the Eameses' biographers, at the expense of the couple's other architectural designs. Biographers John and Marilyn Neuhart wrote that the structures had become so closely associated with the Eameses that "it is hard to imagine the Eames House being inhabited by anyone other than Charles and Ray Eames". Building Design magazine wrote that the house, along with the Eameses' furniture, contributed to Charles's reputation as a designer.

The house became a symbol of the entire Case Study House program and was sometimes described as the most famous such house. The use of mass-produced industrial materials, left exposed in the finished design, became a notable feature of the Eames House. Although similar structures had existed as far back as the mid-19th century, the Eames House was frequently cited as an example of a building with mass-produced materials, at least in its initial years. The house helped inspire the use of prefabricated industrial materials in a wider range of architectural contexts. One writer for the Los Angeles Times said the house was built "long before the new phrase, high tech, became part of the architectural jargon". Thomas Hines classified the Eames House as one of three major mid-20th-century American glass houses, along with Philip Johnson's Glass House and Ludwig Mies van der Rohe's Farnsworth House, though unlike at the Glass and Farnsworth houses, glass was not the primary material in the Eames House's facade.

=== Reception ===
The house was widely praised by modernists of the time, and historian Arthur Drexler saw the Eames House as a major postwar work, writing that contemporary commentators "hailed Eames' house for demonstrating a kind of prefabrication". Commentators praised the house's modular panels as demonstrating the versatility of the technologies available at the time, and Beatriz Colomina said the rapid pace of construction also bore similarities to their furniture designs. The exterior was often compared to Piet Mondrian's paintings, though Ray chafed at such comparisons. Of the interior, The Architectural Review wrote that the decorative arrangements signified the Eameses' view of the world as a Gesamtkunstwerk or "total artwork", and another commentator said the arrangements gradually overshadowed "the dominance of the structure".

==== 1950s to 1980s ====
The design was initially likened to a Japanese lantern or Chinese kite. In 1950, Life magazine wrote that the Eames House "is extraordinarily functional, built for a couple that likes to live without servants or cocktail parties and work surrounded by the varied objects that interest them". The Architectural Review, writing in 1956, called the Eames House "the most worthwhile sight in the area", finding photographs of the house to be unflattering. Vogue magazine wrote in 1959 that the double-height interiors and colorful designs created "a superb feeling of space". An early observer contrasted the Eames and Entenza houses as "technological twins but architectural opposites", citing the Eames House's open plan and the Entenza House's horizontal circulation. Conversely, the Los Angeles Examiner wrote that the design "affronted Traditional sensibilities and confounded those who didn't expect a house to look like a warehouse".

Artforum wrote in 1963 that the house's design succeeded because the materials' "quality of regularity and order never dominated the total form". A 1966 Architectural Design article about the Eameses' work praised the house's style and sturdy construction, comparing it to a "cultural gift parcel". The Los Angeles Times wrote that the house was "exposed and chaste" and that the interior decorations enhanced the design. In 1978, the Associated Press wrote that the house "was one of Eames' most innovative creations and is considered a classic in design". Paul Goldberger said the same year that the house was "a pair of graceful, light boxes" and that its objects were arranged "without creating the slightest sense of clutter". Architectural critic Leon Whiteson wrote in 1987 that the house was "mainstream modernism at its graceful best", and I D magazine wrote in 1989 that the house "changed the way we saw architecture forever".

==== 1990s to present ====
After Ray's death, in 1991, architect Aaron Betsky wrote that he considered the house possibly Los Angeles's most beautiful residence, saying the design "tries to make you feel as if you are part of a three-dimensional composition in which everything has its place". The next year, The New Republic wrote that the house "became a demonstration that modern design could be humanized, made relaxed and domestic and cheerful". James Steele wrote in 1994 that the Eames House, in its use of prefabricated material, stayed true to the Case Study program's intentions more than other early Case Study houses had. Journalist Hugh Aldersey-Williams wrote in 1998 that the "honest and humane" character of the Eames House contrasted with Johnson's Glass House, built simultaneously with "cold and deceitful lines". The next year, Joseph Giovannini wrote that the house "embodied democracy" because of its mass-produced nature.

Paul Betts wrote for The Art Bulletin in 2000 that the house's interior design and colorful, diverse exterior "represented one of modernism's most stunning achievements in domestic architecture". The next year, Eames Demetrios wrote that despite his myriad visits to the house, the landscaping, outdoor–indoor integration, and facade reflections stunned him every time. After the grounds opened to the public, The Wall Street Journal wrote that the house's pavilions "are proudly informal as well as modernist", and The New York Times wrote, "What's striking is not just the architecture but the otherworldly peacefulness of the site." BBC News wrote in 2017 that the Eameses' "complementary talents came together" in the house.

The Financial Times wrote in 2022 that the interior "speaks to the openness and curiosity" shared by Charles and Ray, and the same publication said in 2026 that the interiors had a "childlike spirit of play". Also in the 2020s, The Architectural Review wrote that the Eames House's design did well in balancing "frailty and robustness", and The Sydney Morning Herald wrote that the design had an "inspired simplicity" enhanced by the Eameses' belongings.

=== Architectural influence ===
The design was particularly attractive to high-tech style British architects.

The Eameses' Herman Miller showroom, designed in 1948, bore numerous stylistic similarities to the house, including the use of decorative panels and minimalist architectural details. The exactly-contemporary Entenza House shared some design details, such as a steel frame, although the Entenza House's decorations were less colorful and more reminiscent of cells. The Eameses also created the Eames Storage Units, loosely based on the exterior design. The couple had intended for the design concept to be mass-produced, but this ultimately never happened. Replicas of one of the house's custom-designed coffee tables have also been sold.

Around the world, the house's design also inspired other architects and various residences. Frank Gehry, for example, cited the house as an influence on his work. The design was particularly attractive to high-tech style British architects. These included Richard Rogers, Michael Hopkins, and Norman Foster, many of whom came to visit. Rogers cited the house as a design influence for his parents' house in London; he and Renzo Piano went on to co-design Paris's Centre Pompidou, whose "inside-out" design was described by architect Tim Vreeland as copying several of the house's design principles. Piano called it one of his favorite 20th-century buildings, citing its landscaping and structural design, and Foster called it one of his overall favorites because of its simultaneously playful and serious character. British architecture critic Rayner Banham said the design "had a profound effect on many of my generation in Britain and Europe".

The design of the Eames House was partially replicated in two pavilions, which were built at the Triennale di Milano in 2026 as part of an exhibit about the Eameses' house designs. The pavilions included design details such as panels made of different materials, along with a replica of the bell outside the door. Following the Triennale, the Eames Office and Spanish firm Kettal began selling kit houses inspired by the Eames House's design, with aluminum, wood, glass, and composite parts. These parts could be configured into buildings of various sizes.

=== Awards and landmark designations ===
In 1967, the American Institute of Architects' (AIA) Southern California chapter ranked the Eames House among Los Angeles's 36 best postwar works. The AIA further recognized the Eames House with its Twenty-five Year Award in 1978, saying the house had "transcend[ed] mere construction and avoid[ed] the sterility by combining elegance with utility". Gehry wrote that the use of raw materials and the arrangement of the Eameses' belongings were major contributing factors for the award. When the Eames Office received the Royal Gold Medal in 1979, the Royal Institute of British Architects called the Eames House "a seminal building that appealed and pointed the way at so many levels simultaneously". The Los Angeles Times ranked the building fourth in Southern California in a 2008 poll, behind the Schindler House, Kaufmann Desert House, and Ennis House.

The house was designated as a Los Angeles Historic-Cultural Monument on July 15, 1988, as monument No. 381. It was designated a National Historic Landmark (NHL) on September 20, 2006, for its importance as a postwar American architectural work and its associations with the Eameses and the Case Study program. The NHL status was ratified by Charles's descendants on his hundredth birthday in 2007. By virtue of its NHL status, the house is also listed on the National Register of Historic Places (NRHP) and the California Register of Historical Resources. Ten of the other remaining Case Study houses were added to the NRHP in 2013, joining the Eames House on the register.

=== Media and exhibits ===
From the outset, the Eames House attracted the attention of the international architectural media.

From the outset, the Eames House attracted the attention of the international architectural media. Over the years, the house has been depicted in fashion photoshoots and advertising photographs. Among the first media works to depict the house were a set of images taken by Peter Stackpole in 1950 and a furniture catalog by Herman Miller in 1952. The Eameses produced a film about the house in 1955, House: After Five Years of Living. The film, running about 10 minutes without narration, features over 300 photographs of the house. The house has also been depicted in such media as a video tour of the house by actor Ice Cube.

The Eames House was depicted in Museum of Modern Art (MoMA) exhibits about modernist architecture in 1953 and 1965. Architectural drawings and images of the house were also displayed in a 1973 MoMA exhibit about Charles's work and in a 1999 exhibit at the Library of Congress about the Eameses' designs. Over 1,800 objects from the living room were temporarily disassembled and recreated at the Los Angeles County Museum of Art in 2011, where they were part of the exhibition "California Design, 1930–1965: Living in a Modern Way".

== See also ==
- List of National Historic Landmarks in California
- List of Registered Historic Places in Los Angeles
- List of Los Angeles Historic-Cultural Monuments on the Westside
