= Case Study House No. 16 =

Historic house in California, United States

- U.S. National Register of Historic Places
- Location within the Los Angeles metropolitan area Location within California Location within the United States
- Location: 1811 Bel Air Rd., Los Angeles, California
- Coordinates: 34.102410°N 118.449810°W
- Area: 0.19 acres (0.077 ha)
- Built: 1953
- Architect: Craig Ellwood
- Architectural style: International Style
- MPS: Case Study House Program MPS
- NRHP reference No.: 13000515
- Added to NRHP: July 24, 2013

Case Study House No. 16 (also known as Case Study House '53 or the Salzman House) is a residence located at 1811 Bel Air Road in Los Angeles, California, United States. Completed in 1953, it was designed by Craig Ellwood and is his only substantially intact design built as part of the Case Study Houses program. It is one of two Case Study houses that were given the designation House 16; the other, by Rodney Walker, has since been demolished. The house is a single-story residence with a flat roof and two bedrooms. Case Study House No. 16 was acquired by Muriel Norton, its first occupant, in 1967 and added to the National Register of Historic Places in 2013. After Norton's death, it was sold in 2019, then placed for sale again in 2025.

== Description ==
Case Study House No. 16 is located at 1811 Bel Air Road in the Bel Air neighborhood of Los Angeles, California, United States. Designed by Craig Ellwood, it is the only substantially intact design of the three Case Study Houses he designed; the other two have been remodeled. All three houses followed Raphael Soriano's design principle of open plan spaces without columns, spanned by long steel beams. The Bel Air Road house is one of two Case Study houses that were given the designation House 16; the other, by Rodney Walker, was located at 9945 Beverly Grove Drive in Beverly Hills and has since been demolished.

=== Exterior ===
The house, occupying a site of about 0.19 acres (0.077 ha), is a single-story residence with a flat roof. The house measures 28 by 56 feet (8.5 by 17.1 m) across and is arranged on a grid of modules measuring 4 feet (1.2 m) wide. For the house's steel framework, Ellwood used lightweight, high-strength carbon steel that had been molded into hollow square beams. At the time of the building's construction, this material was plentiful because railroads across the US were being removed, and their rails were being melted down. By using square-shaped steel beams made of recycled railroad tracks, Ellwood saved $800 on construction costs, and he was able to order 3,000 pounds (1,400 kg) less steel, compared with if he had used traditional I-beams. The beams themselves are welded together.

Ellwood sought to make walls more prominent in his work, in contrast to other Case Study architects such as Raphael Soriano, who sought to hide or de-emphasize that feature. The exterior, made of translucent panels, was designed to give the impression of a floating glass structure illuminated from within. The panels, which provide privacy to the bedrooms, do not reach the ceiling; the tops of the walls either have transparent glazing or are open to the elements. These panels extend outside the house as screens separating the service yard and play yards. Ellwood also filled in some of the spaces on the walls with fir siding, glass, and Palo Verde stone.

At the front entrance, a brick wall extends outward from the house, separating the entrance and carport. The front entrance has an exterior clad in grooved planks of fir. The carport itself occupies a concrete floor slab, and the roof is cantilevered outward above the walls to give the impression that it is floating. The entrance has two skylights made of wire glass, and the rest of the facade also has sliding glass doors. There are play areas in the backyard, including a brick wall with a custom-designed jungle gym built into it.

=== Interior ===
The floor area is variously cited as spanning 1,664 square feet (154.6 m^{2}) or 1,750 square feet (163 m^{2}). The interior is relatively small compared to other houses in Bel Air, with two bedrooms and two bathrooms. Entering the foyer, there are vertical boards of Douglas fir on the walls. Some interior ceilings and walls continue outside. There is also a fireplace at the southwest corner, which is made of Palo Verde stone and extends outside. Interior features include a mirror in one room, which swings open to access a dressing room. The original occupant, Muriel Norton, retained most of the equipment and built-in furniture that came with the house. Over the years, Norton made minor changes to the interior, including vertical blinds behind the sliding glass doors, as well as adding gray tiles to interior and exterior floor surfaces.

== History ==
The house was built as part of the Case Study Houses program, announced by publisher John Entenza in the January 1945 issue of Arts & Architecture magazine. The program, which ran until 1966, sought to develop inexpensive and efficient model homes to meet housing demand in the postwar United States. The first 13 Case Study houses were developed together in the 1940s, while the other houses were developed incrementally. These houses were built on private lots across Southern California, rather than at expositions or government-owned land as other demonstration houses had been, and were given a strict budget. The early Case Study houses tended to use wood, brick, concrete, and glass. Because the houses did not receive government subsidies, materials were either donated or, more commonly, bought at market value. The second phase of Case Study houses built after 1950 tended to use more steel, following the loosening of US governmental restrictions on steel.

Architects such as Craig Ellwood and Pierre Koenig were responsible for some of the post-1950 Case Study houses. Ellwood, while not formally trained as an architect, had experience as a construction contractor, and later recalled that Los Angeles "was wide open, eager for experiment", at the time he was commissioned for a Case Study House design. When he joined the Case Study program, he designed Case Study House No. 16 in 1952 for his associate, Henry Salzman. The house was finished the next year and was originally known as House '53 or the Salzman House. House 16 was the first of three houses he designed for the program. Following completion of House '53, Ellwood went on to design House 17, built in 1956, and the Fields House (Ellwood's House 18), built in 1958.

The first actual occupant of the house was Muriel Norton, who, after renting the house for a decade, bought it in 1967. The Los Angeles Times retrospectively wrote in 2003 that the use of steel and glass, along with the flat roof, "epitomized Entenza's—and Ellwood's—penchant for elegantly minimalist, finely detailed architecture". House 16, along with nine of the other remaining Case Study houses, were added to the National Register of Historic Places in 2013. The NRHP designation was granted because of the exposed structural-steel design and the fact that it retained much of its original design. Norton lived there until her death; afterward, in 2019, the house was placed for sale at $3 million, the first time in a half-century that it had been placed for sale. The house was sold that year to Jamie Mazur, a fashion entrepreneur, for roughly its listing price. The house was placed for sale again in 2025 for about $5.4 million.

== See also ==
- National Register of Historic Places listings in Los Angeles

== Sources ==
- Making LA modern: Craig Ellwood: myth, man, designer. New York, NY: Rizzoli International Publications. 2018. ISBN 978-0-8478-6153-8.
- McCoy, Esther (1977). Case Study Houses, 1945-1962. Hennessey & Ingalls. ISBN 978-0-912158-70-9.
- National Register of Historic Places Inventory/Nomination: Case Study House No. 16 (Report). National Park Service. 2013. With accompanying pictures
- Neuhart, Marilyn; Neuhart, John (May 25, 1994). Eames House. Wiley. ISBN 978-3-433-02428-7.
