= West House (Los Angeles) =

Historic house in California, United States

- Case Study House No. 18
- U.S. National Register of Historic Places
- Location within the Los Angeles metropolitan area Location within California Location within the United States
- Location: 199 Chautauqua Blvd., Los Angeles, California
- Coordinates: 34.030043°N 118.51831°W
- Area: 0.5 acres (0.20 ha)
- Built: 1948
- Architect: Rodney A. Walker
- Architectural style: Modern Movement
- MPS: Case Study House Program MPS
- NRHP reference No.: 13000516
- Added to NRHP: July 24, 2013

The West House (a.k.a. Case Study House No. 18) is a residence located at 199 Chautauqua Boulevard in the Pacific Palisades neighborhood of Los Angeles, California, United States. It was designed by Rodney A. Walker and built in 1948 as part of Arts & Architecture magazine's Case Study Houses program. The house is one story high with two bedrooms. It is listed on the National Register of Historic Places.

== Description ==
The West House or Case Study House No. 18 is at 199 Chautauqua Boulevard in the Pacific Palisades neighborhood of Los Angeles, California, United States. The West House is one of four residences designed on the same city block for the Case Study Houses program. The other three are the Eames House (Case Study House No. 8), the Entenza House (No. 9), and the Bailey House (No. 20). The block abuts Corona Del Mar and other property to the northwest, Chautauqua Boulevard to the northeast and southeast, and the Pacific Coast Highway to the southwest. The houses share the same general plot but are oriented to provide privacy to each residence. The West House is located on a 1/2-acre (0.20 ha) portion of its site, positioned toward the northern and western boundaries of the site, away from the Pacific Coast Highway. This allowed the house to be naturally shielded by the site's topography, while also overlooking the Pacific Ocean to the south and open field to the east.

The house's exterior has a U-shaped plan oriented toward the south. The West House's eastern wing has the primary living spaces, while the western wing was originally the garage and secondary entrance. Between them is an open space originally used as a dog run and service yard. A covered walkway leads to the front door on the eastern elevation. The sides facing the road are made of solid material. Large portions of the exteriors are made of glass, including full-height glass doors and windows facing the ocean. The house has a flat roof, which rises to 11 feet (3.4 m) above the living-room fireplace (in the eastern wing). There are clerestory windows between the two roof levels.

The house is listed in property listings as a one-story building covering 1,701 square feet (158.0 m^{2}), though the National Register of Historic Places nomination for the house cited it as a 1,600-square-foot (150 m^{2}) building. It has a wood frame with beams dividing the building into modules at intervals of 3 feet (0.91 m). The house's living room and garden room (the latter partly indoors and partly outdoors) is at the eastern end of the house. There is a double-sided fireplace between the living room from the garden room. The West House has two bedrooms, which are on the northern side of the house. There are also two bathrooms at the house's northern end. In addition, the house has a cabin with hot tub and sauna.

== History ==
The house was built as part of the Case Study Houses program, announced by publisher John Entenza in the January 1945 issue of Arts & Architecture magazine. The program, which ran until 1966, sought to develop inexpensive and efficient model homes to meet housing demand in the postwar United States. The first 13 Case Study houses were developed together in the 1940s, while the other houses were developed incrementally. These houses were built on private lots across Southern California, rather than at expositions or government-owned land as other demonstration houses had been, and were given a strict budget. The early Case Study houses tended to use wood, brick, concrete, and glass. Because the houses did not receive government subsidies, materials were either donated or, more commonly, bought at market value.

The numerical designations assigned to the Case Study houses were not issued in strictly chronological order; both Rodney Walker and Craig Ellwood were assigned to design three Case Study houses numbered 16 through 18. Walker's Case Study House No. 18 is known as the West House and was the first of the two House 18s to be built. Walker's House 18 was built for an engineer and his wife, a gardener and clothing designer. It was completed in 1948.

House 18, along with nine of the other remaining Case Study houses, were added to the National Register of Historic Places in 2013. It remained a private residence in the 21st century. The West House was sold in 2015 for about $6.5 million. The house was placed on sale for $10 million in 2018; after going unsold, it was again placed for sale in 2023 for about $12 million. The house survived the 2025 Palisades Fire, which destroyed much of the surrounding neighborhood.

== See also ==
- National Register of Historic Places listings in Los Angeles

== Sources ==
- McCoy, Esther (1977). Case Study Houses, 1945-1962. Hennessey & Ingalls. ISBN 978-0-912158-70-9.
- National Register of Historic Places Inventory/Nomination: Case Study House No. 16 (Report). National Park Service. 2013. With accompanying pictures
- Neuhart, Marilyn; Neuhart, John (May 25, 1994). Eames House. Wiley. ISBN 978-3-433-02428-7.
