= Oscar Chambers House =

Historic house in Arkansas, United States

- Oscar Chamber House
- U.S. National Register of Historic Places
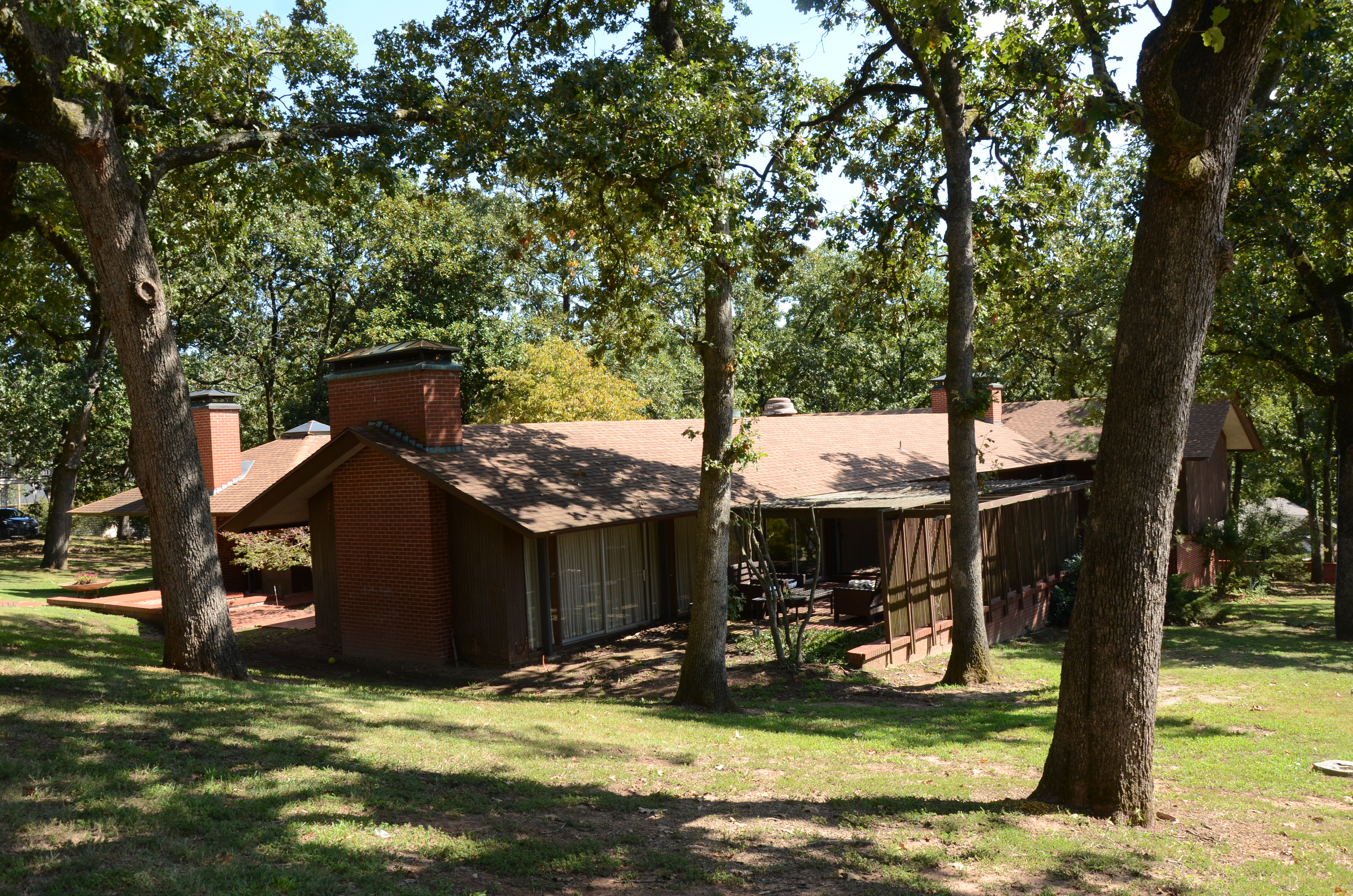

- Location within Arkansas Location within the United States
- Location: 3200 S. Dallas St. Fort Smith, Arkansas
- Coordinates: 35°21′11″N 94°23′57″W
- Area: less than one acre
- Built: 1963
- Architect: Ernie Jacks
- Architectural style: Mid-Century Modern
- NRHP reference No.: 16000320
- Added to NRHP: June 7, 2016

The Oscar Chamber House is a historic house at 3200 South Dallas Street in Fort Smith, Arkansas. Built in 1963–64 to a design by Arkansas architect Ernie Jacks, it is a prominent local example of residential Mid-Century Modern architecture, set in a neighborhood of more conventional ranch and split entry houses. It is a single-story frame structure, with a broad gabled roof, vertical board siding, and a concrete foundation. It has casement windows and sliding glass doors providing access to the outside. The structure is basically a U shape built around a courtyard at the back.

The design of the house is a product of Jacks' early work in Los Angeles with architects Craig Ellwood and Edward Durrell Stone. Stone's influence can be seen in the way hallways in the home are set against outside walls overlooking the central garden, and also how the corridors are widened to include built-in storage. Ellwood's influence can be seen in the way the steel superstructure is built into the hillside.

Professor Jacks considers the Chambers house to be one of his prized accomplishments, both for the quality of materials (including walnut woodwork throughout the house and restaurant quality kitchen equipment), and the amenities included in the design. Features of the house include a Jacuzzi, four fireplaces, a library, and an entire wing of children's rooms, including a play room and two story play house designed for Chambers' children.

The Chambers family only lived in the house for a few years. Oscar Chambers moved his family to Texas and gave the house to his church.

The house was listed on the National Register of Historic Places in 2016.

== See also ==
- National Register of Historic Places listings in Sebastian County, Arkansas
