= Pergine =

Pergine may refer to:

- Pergine Valsugana, a municipality, in Trentino, in the northern Italian region Trentino-Alto Adige/Südtirol
- Pergine Valdarno, a municipality, in the Province of Arezzo, in the Italian region Tuscany
