= Braun Music Center =

Music education center in California, US

Coordinates: 37°25′26″N 122°10′10″W

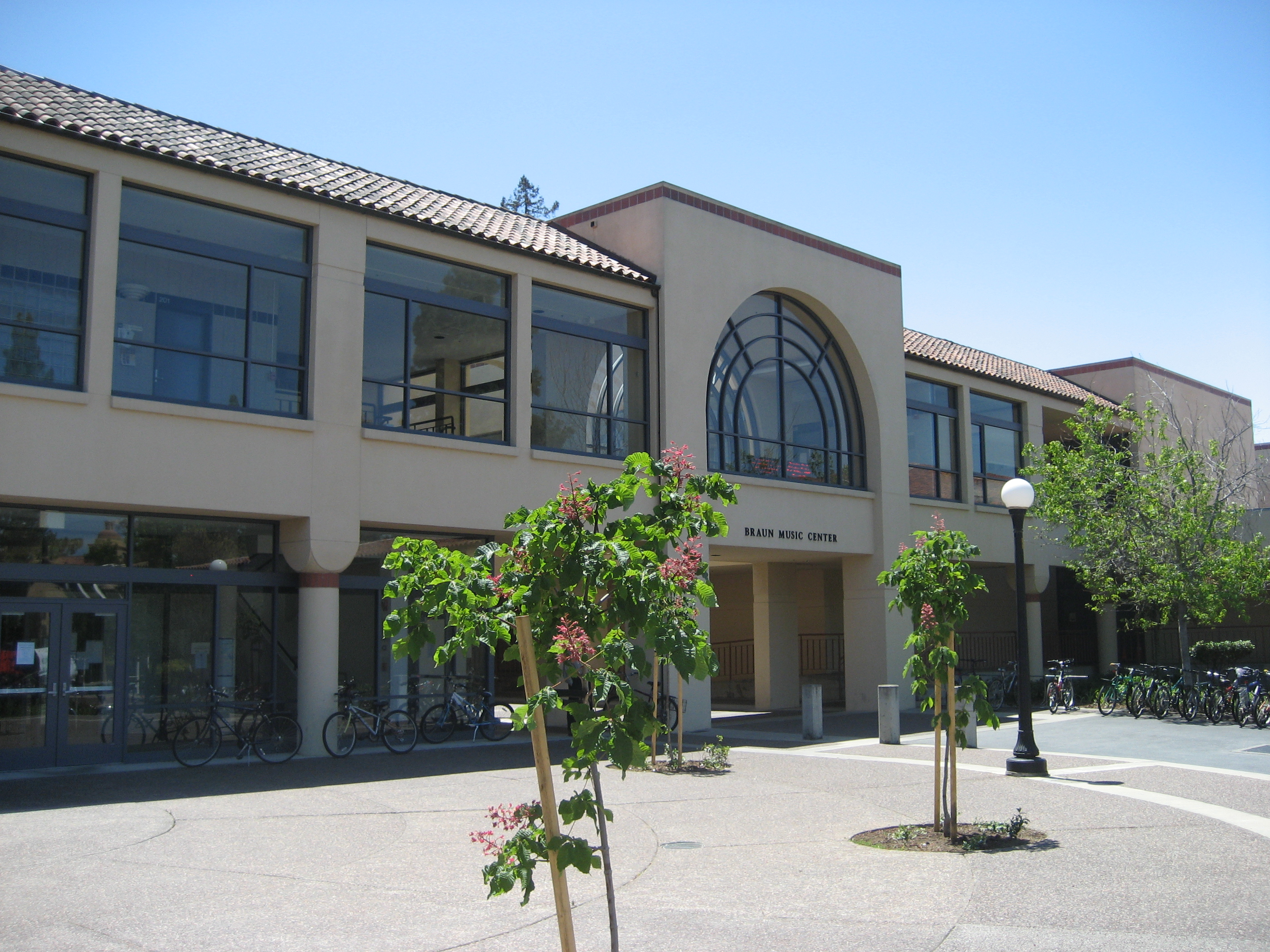
Braun Music Center

Braun Music Center, known colloquially as Braun, is a music education building at Stanford University in California. Opening its doors in 1984, Braun serves as both the epicenter for music at Stanford, as well as a link between Stanford's main residential and activities centers. As the main building for the Department of Music, Braun is the venue for the department's concerts and recitals and offers rehearsal studios and practice facilities as well as classrooms and offices.

== History ==
The largest donor for the construction of the hall was the Carl F. Braun Trust under the trusteeship of Carl's son, John Gilbert Braun. The Carl Braun Trust donated a substantial portion of the more than $6.3 the million needed for the project. John G. Braun was a financier educated at UC Berkeley and a lifetime trustee of Caltech. However, John donated the funds for Stanford's music center in honor of his late father, Carl Braun, who earned a degree in mechanical engineering from Stanford in 1907.

The Stanford Music Department, previously housed in the Knoll, had been fighting for a new building since their inception in 1947. Chairman of the department Albert Cohen put it bluntly, "our facilities have been inadequate for awhile... there are not enough classrooms in the Knoll, and that the ones that do exist do not have acoustically treated walls." The Knoll was in such poor shape structurally at the time that the music library had nearly caved in 1979. Despite moving facilities, the Music Department retained control of the Knoll (which received desperately needed renovations from 2004 to 2005) and today houses the Stanford Center for Computer Research in Music and Acoustics (CCRMA).

The Board of Trustees authorized the project in December of 1979 and chose the architectural firm Marquis Associates of San Francisco to design the center a few months later in February of 1980. Excavation at the site began in 1981 and was originally slated to be completed and open for students and faculty for the Fall term of 1983. The project was delayed extensively due to heavy rain and wind damage, flooding, and a United Stanford Workers' strike. Faculty and staff of the Music Department moved into the almost completed center January of 1984, although construction continued around them.

The official opening of the Center was postponed briefly due to John Braun's health troubles.

== Architecture ==
The long, stucco-faced, 2-story building occupies a critical place on Stanford's campus, bisecting "The Row" (a residential portion of campus) and White Plaza. The building's main architectural feature is its long open-air arcade that the street Lausen Mall passes through, allowing students to easily traverse between the popular residential and social hubs on the University. The Braun Center preserves traditional Stanford architectural styles, boasting bright glass arches and red-tiled columns.

Braun's east wing houses Campbell Recital Hall, an intimate performance venue. The west wing houses the Stanford Music Library which boasts antiquarian holdings of original scores manuscripts along with the Stanford Archive of Recorded Sound. The building also includes practice rooms and offices for music department faculty.

Braun is adjacent to Dinkelspiel Auditorium, one of Stanford's primary performance venues.
