= Laterina =

- Frazione
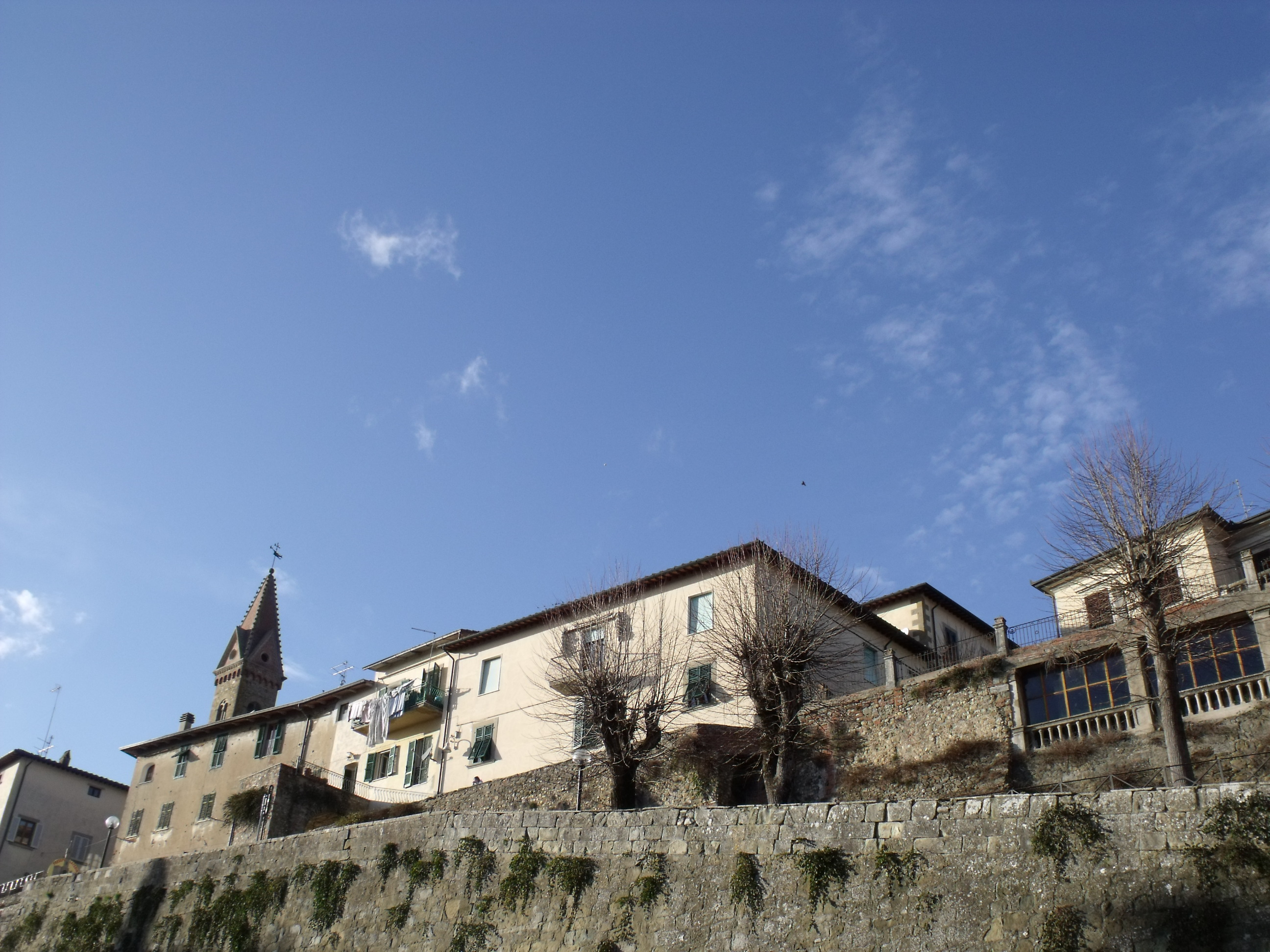
- Panorama of Laterina

- Location of Laterina in Italy
- Coordinates: 43°30′N 11°43′E
- Country: Italy
- Region: Tuscany
- Province: Province of Arezzo (AR)
- Comune: Laterina Pergine Valdarno

Area
  - Total: 24.0 km^{2} (9.3 sq mi)
- Elevation: 240 m (790 ft)

Population (Dec. 2004)
  - Total: 3,510
  - Density: 146/km^{2} (379/sq mi)
- Demonym: Laterinesi
- Time zone: UTC+1 (CET)
  - Summer (DST): UTC+2 (CEST)
- Postal code: 52020
- Dialing code: 0575
- Website: Official website

Laterina is a frazione of Laterina Pergine Valdarno in the Province of Arezzo in the Italian region Tuscany, located about 50 kilometres (31 mi) southeast of Florence and about 14 kilometres (9 mi) northwest of Arezzo.

The Romito di Laterina, the bridge in the background of the Mona Lisa, is located in Laterina.
