= Romito di Laterina bridge =

Bridge in Laterina, Italy

Romito di Laterina
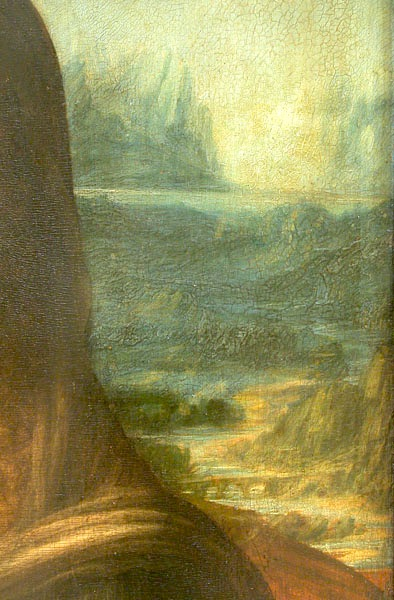
- The bridge in the background of the Mona Lisa
- Coordinates: 43°29′58″N 11°40′41″E
- Crosses: Arno river
- Locale: Laterina, Province of Arezzo, Italy

Characteristics
- Design: Arch bridge
- Material: Stone
- No. of spans: 4

Location
- Click on map for a fullscreen view

The Romito di Laterina Bridge is a four arched bridge from Etruscan-Roman times located in Laterina in the Province of Arezzo, Italy. In 2023, Italian historian Silvano Vinceti proposed it could be the bridge in background of Leonardo da Vinci's painting, Mona Lisa.

== History ==
The bridge was built in Etruscan-Roman times, and it rested on two cliffs over the Arno. It was a part of a shortcut route that connected Arezzo, Fiesole, and Florence.

According to documents belonging to the Medici family that were found in the Florence state archives shows that the bridge was very busy and functional between 1501 and 1503. Records show that da Vinci was in the area at the service of Cesare Borgia, a 15th century nobleman who was the son of Pope Alexander VI.

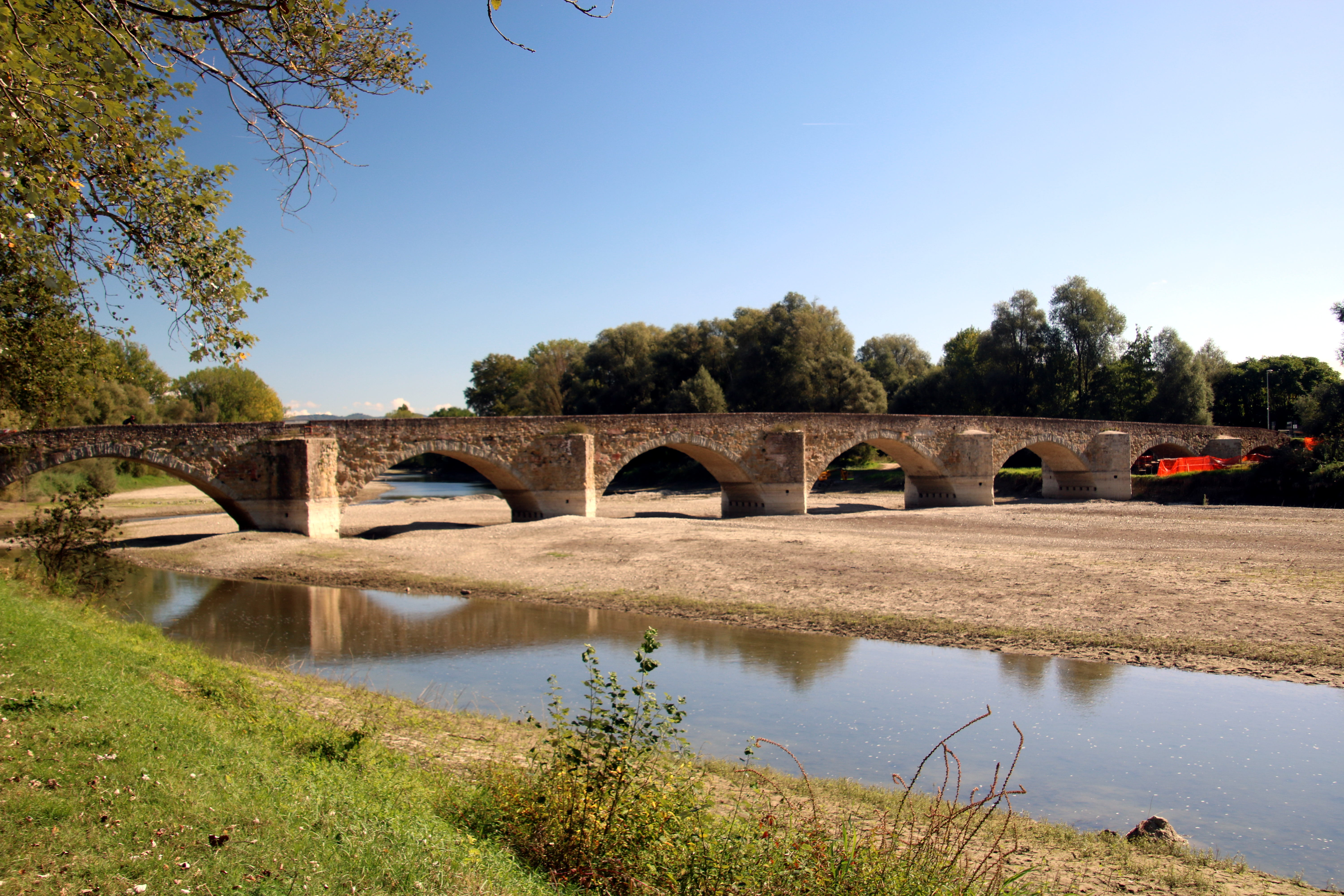
The Ponte Buriano was believed to have been the bridge in the background

In May 2023, Italian historian Silvano Vinceti proposed it could be the bridge in the background of the Mona Lisa. Vinceti noted other bridges that were thought to have been in the background did not match the description of the bridge seen in the background of the painting. He based his findings on historical documents and drone images, as well as making comparisons between the painting and photographs of the area.

The bridge is now mostly destroyed, and only one arch remains.
