= Cemesto =

Composite building material

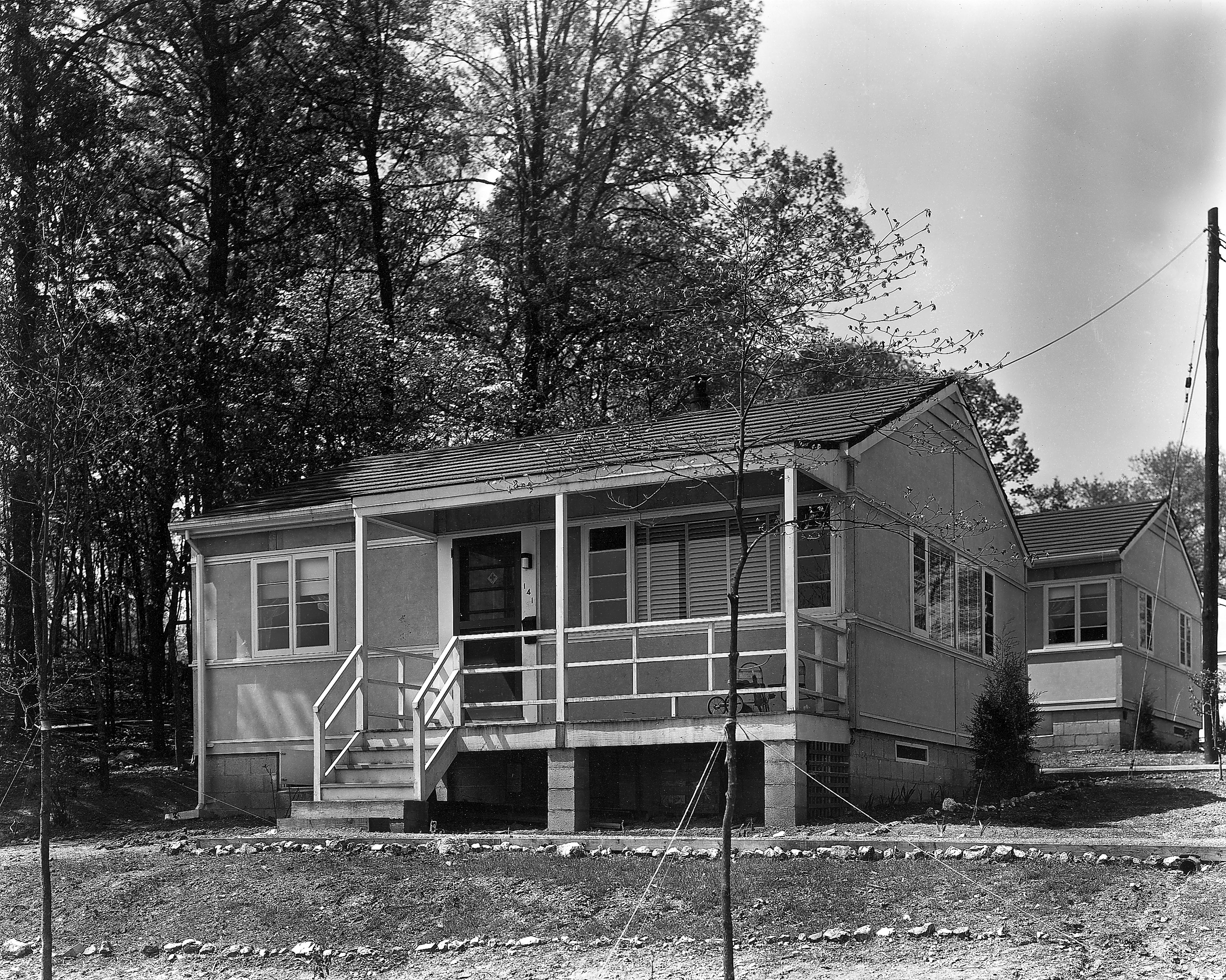
A house built with cemesto panels in the Oak Ridge, Tennessee Defense Community, 1949.

Cemesto is a sturdy, lightweight, waterproof and fire-resistant composite building material made from a core of sugarcane fiber insulating board, called Celotex, surfaced on both sides with asbestos cement. It was originally developed by the Celotex Corporation and first introduced to the market in 1931.

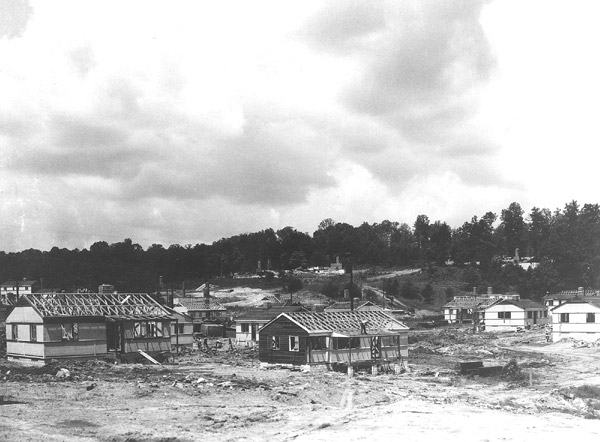
Prefabricated homes incorporating cemesto panels under construction in Oak Ridge, Tennessee, during World War II. White cemesto panels can be seen on several of the homes.

Cemesto was a pivotal material in the development of World War II-era defense housing, which provided homes for workers mobilized to meet wartime production needs.

== Use and characteristics ==
Cemesto panels consisted of an inner board of Celotex insulating lumber coated first in a proprietary sealant then in a layer of asbestos cement. The base panels were manufactured from bagasse, a fibrous byproduct of sugarcane, using a felting process. It was manufactured in the form of boards and panels that were 4 feet (1.2 m) wide, about 1.5 inches (3.8 cm) thick, and 4 feet (1.2 m) to 12 feet (3.7 m) long. These boards did not need to be painted and were delivered by the manufacturer precut to the desired size.

Cemesto was primarily used for the interior and exterior walls of low-cost houses, gas stations, factories, and office buildings. The primary structural element of the cemesto house is the window panel. Treated wood frames are attached at the top and bottom of the window unit, which run horizontally around the room as well as along the floor and ceiling. Panels of cemesto are then inserted into these frames. The panels support the weight of the ceiling by distributing it across their length to periodic columns rather than vertically to the foundation.

== History ==
Cemesto was introduced by the Celotex Corporation in 1931. The John B. Pierce Foundation and Celotex collaborated to develop a prefabrication system for building low-cost housing using cemesto panels, in which single cemesto panels were slid horizontally into light wooden frames to create walls. Prior to the adoption of cemesto to create prefabricated housing, most rationalized fabrication systems relied on vertical ceiling-height panels supported by a frame. A prototype cemesto house was displayed at the 1939 World's Fair in New York City. The Pierce system was first used in 1941 for building employee housing at the Glenn L. Martin Aircraft Company, near Baltimore, Maryland. For this development, named Aero Acres, the architecture firm of Skidmore, Owings & Merrill designed gable-roofed Cape Cod houses with dimensions of 24 feet (7.3 m) by 28 feet (8.5 m), featuring large commercial-style windows in their principal rooms. In 1941, 600 homes were built at Aero Acres using this design.

During World War II, when other building materials were in short supply, cemesto was used extensively in the United States. Cemesto was used to build temporary office buildings in Washington, D.C. Skidmore, Owings & Merrill adapted the Pierce system and used cemesto panels for the designs of some 2,500 prefabricated homes, known by the nickname "cemestos," erected in Oak Ridge, Tennessee, to house Manhattan Project workers and their families. In 1942, the U.S. Farm Security Administration built 400 cemesto homes in Maryland at a site alongside Aero Acres.

During the 1940s, the manufacturer of cemesto touted it as a material that would in the future make it possible to mass-produce housing at a low cost. One use of the material during the postwar era was in the late 1940s in Circle Pines, Minnesota, where cemesto panels were used in building the first homes in what was envisioned to be a housing cooperative for people of color. The use of cemesto in Circle Pines came to be regarded as substandard construction, as the builders failed to adequately seal the joints between cemesto panels.

Several prominent architects embraced cemesto as a modern material and used it in their designs. For the Bousquet-Wightman House in Houston, Texas, built in 1941, architect Donald Barthelme used cemesto panels for exterior sheathing. In 1949, Edward Durell Stone called for cemesto panels in the design of a home to be built in Armonk, New York. That same year, Charles Eames designed his Eames House, Case Study House #8, to use brightly painted and unfinished cemesto panels in a prefabricated steel frame. Frank Lloyd Wright designed the Raymond Carlson House in Phoenix, Arizona, built in 1950, to use a structural system of wood posts and cemesto boards. In the Arthur Pieper House in Paradise Valley, Arizona, built in 1952 from concrete block, Wright used cemesto for the ceilings. In addition to houses and office buildings, cemesto was used to build gasoline stations and factories.
