= Celotex =

Defunct American corporation

Celotex Corporation logo in 1923

Celotex Corporation is a defunct American manufacturer of insulation and construction materials. It was the subject of a number of high-profile lawsuits over products containing asbestos in the 1980s, eventually declaring Chapter 11 bankruptcy in 1990.

== History ==
=== (Louisiana) Celotex Company ===
The company was incorporated in Delaware as the Louisiana Celotex Company on July 16, 1920 and renamed to The Celotex Company on December 26, 1922.

The company produced a Celotex-branded rigid insulating board from bagasse, which was suitable because of the toughness and length of the fibers and which had theretofore been of little use except for its low fuel value (due to high moisture content). The company started volume production in 1922 (19mmsf) and ramped up to 284.6mmsf in 1928.

The plant with the main building of 1,000ft x 125ft had an initial cost of more than $500,000 and was completed in August 1921. On August 18 the first 12 feet wide, 800 feet long board was turned out. Standard sizes produced from those were 12x8 feet and came in 0.5-inch and 0.25-inch thicknesses. The thermal and acoustic insulation board was originally a war emergency invention. The operation could draw its raw material from about 200,000 acres of surrounding Louisiana sugar land (incl. photo).

Sales offices were in Atlanta, Boston, Chicago, Cleveland, Dallas, Detroit, Kansas City, Los Angeles, Minneapolis, St. Louis and Seattle. Foreign sales offices were in Antwerp, Berlin, Buenos Aires, Rome, Tokyo, London and Sydney.

Celotex was placed in receivership on June 16, 1932 with $2,423,500 of bonds outstanding.

From bagasse to riches back to bagasse.

By the Plan of Reorganization dated May 1, 1934 and last modified Aug 7, 1935 the company emerged from bankruptcy on Sep 30, 1935. Holders of old preferred stock received for each old share 0.5 shares of preferred and 0.5 shares of common stock of the new company and the right to buy 0.5 common shares at the rate of $6.66 per new common share. Holders of old common stock received 1/3 of new common stock and the right to buy 1/6 common share at $6.66 per share. The stock was delisted on the NYSE on Oct 28, 1935.

==== Operations ====
Production (mmsf)
1924 (10 mos)	58.9
1925	106.3
1926	194.9
1927	242.3
1928	284.6
1929	348.6

The company owned 150 acres of land in Marrero, Louisiana where the main plant was built (29.9053°N 90.1263°W). It also owned all its machinery, the only properties leased were for out-of-town office spaces. In 1929 the company operated 18 baling stations.

The plant's first production line could turn out 75,000sf per day. In 1926 there were four producing 750,000sfd and four more units were added in 1927 in a second building bringing the total to 1,750,000sfd.

Baling stations
Name	Near
Glenwild	Berwick
Bileand	Broussard
Cinclare
Cypremost	Louisa
Erath
Sterling	Franklin
Southdown	Houma
Waterford	Killona
Lower La Fourche	Lockport
Glenwood	Napoleonville
Westfield	Paincourtville
Raceland
Reserve
Himalaye	Tallieu
Greenwood	Thibodaux
Laurel Grove	Thibodaux
Evergreen Wallace
Youngsville

Earnings
	Revenue	Profit	Dividends		Surplus
	Revenue	Profit	Pref	Common	Surplus
1925	$4,421,956	$195,646	$155,397	$0	
1926	7,722,144	1,129,546	295,506	230,729	
1927	8,239,122	817,058	306,074	492,671	18,313
1928	8,979,858	1,380,622	364,945	461,733	553,944
1929	10,317,641	1,478,590	365,268	544,310	569,112
1930	8,557,634	244,079	278,558	307,636	—342,116
1931	5,953,405	—130,599	none		—130,599
1932	3,005,785	—1,162,903	none		—1,162,903
1933	2,936,200	—664,122	none		—664,122
1934	3,914,390	—192,689			

Stock Issued as of Jan 1929
Purpose	Pref	Common
Cash	46,655.2	42,288.5
Land	400	400
Patents		72,000
Conversion 10-year 7% bonds	1,941	774
Conversion 3-year 6% notes	620	310
acquisition of Celotex Products Co.	2,570.5	3,070.5
acquisition of Crombie Celotex Co.	335	100
Dividends	688	51,851
Total outstanding	53,210	170,794

=== Celotex Corporation ===
Celotex Corporation was incorporated in Delaware on June 29, 1935 and received the assets and business of the former company on Nov 1, 1935 (start of fiscal year). In 1957 the company's core business was still insulation board made from bagasse in Marrero.

Plants owned in 1957
Location	State	Products
Metuchen	NJ	asbestos-cement board with insulating core (Cemesto) (40.5401°N 74.3695°W)
Port Clinton	OH	gypsum products
Hamlin	TX	gypsum products
Fort Dodge	IA	plaster products, gypsum board; began operations in 1957.
Lagro	IN	rock wool insulation, acoustical mineral tile
Pittston	PA	acoustical mineral tile; 2nd such plant after Lagro began operations in June 1957.
Cleveland	OH	roofing; all 3 acquired by Johns-Manville in 1961
Avery	OH	roofing; all 3 acquired by Johns-Manville in 1961
Madison	IL	roofing; all 3 acquired by Johns-Manville in 1961
Los Angeles	CA	roofing
L'Anse	MI	
Stonebridge, London	UK	

In 1961, Jim Walter Corporation, a homebuilding company, acquired Celotex, moving the headquarters to Tampa, Florida in 1965.

== Celotex Asbestos Litigation and Settlement Trust ==
A $1.2 billion settlement trust was established in 1998 to settle claims arising from asbestos-containing products manufactured by both Celotex and Philip Carey. The claims were filed by workers, former employees, family members and others who developed serious health conditions like mesothelioma from exposure to asbestos. The litigation revealed that Carey and Celotex had long known about the asbestos-exposure risks but failed to warn workers and the public. Celotex emerged from Chapter 11 in 1996. The wallboard business was sold to BPB plc, its roofing products business to CertainTeed in 2000, its fiberboard products division along with the Celotex brand to Knight Industries LLC in 2001, and its rigid foam insulation division to the Dow Chemical Company in 2001. Celotex moved again, to Saint Petersburg, Florida, in 2001.

In 2012, Saint-Gobain acquired the British manufacturing interests of Celotex.

In 2017, a disastrous fire at the Grenfell Tower, London was blamed on exterior cladding manufactured by Celotex-Saint-Gobain. Investigations revealed that Celotex had been aware of the fire risks associated with their products and actively covered up its findings.

As of 2020, the brand name Celotex was owned by Saint-Gobain, which manufactures products under the Celotex brand. This includes products such as insulation boards and insulated plasterboards.

== See also ==
- Celotex Corp. v. Catrett
- Cemesto
- Homasote
