= Laterina Pergine Valdarno =

- Comune
- Comune di Laterina Pergine Valdarno
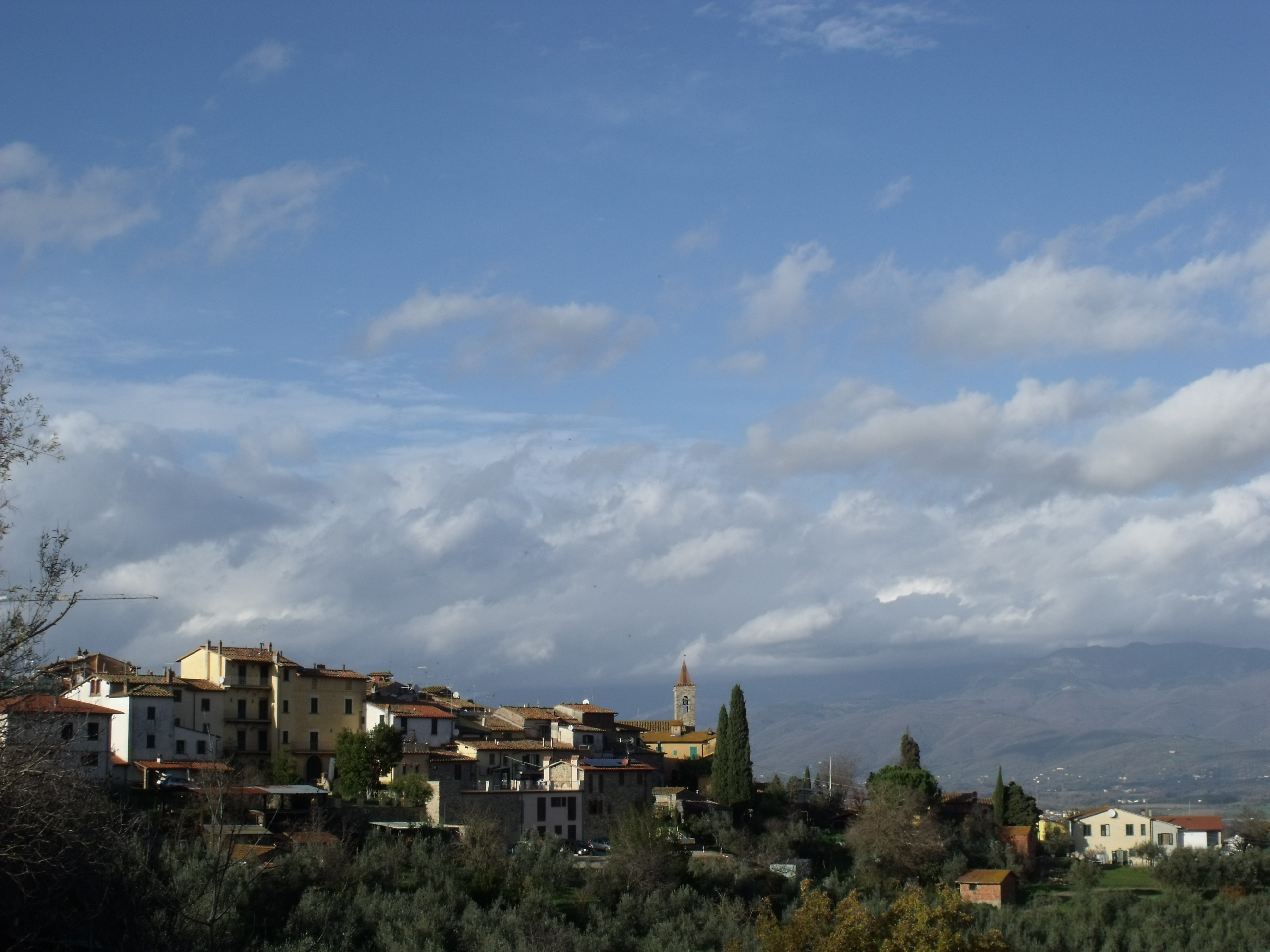
- Panorama of Laterina Pergine Valdarno

- Location within Italy Location within Tuscany
- Coordinates: 43°28′42″N 11°41′9″E
- Country: Italy
- Region: Tuscany
- Province: Arezzo (AR)

Government
  - Mayor: Simona Neri

Area
  - Total: 70.57 km^{2} (27.25 sq mi)
- Elevation: 240 m (790 ft)

Population (31 May 2022)
  - Total: 6,423
  - Density: 91.02/km^{2} (235.7/sq mi)
- Demonym: Laterinesi
- Time zone: UTC+1 (CET)
  - Summer (DST): UTC+2 (CEST)
- Postal code: 52019
- Dialing code: 0575

Laterina Pergine Valdarno is a comune (municipality) in the Province of Arezzo in the Italian region Tuscany.

It was established on 1 January 2018 by the merger of the municipalities of Laterina and Pergine Valdarno.
