= Ellwood Zimmerman House =

House in California, United States (1950–2024)

Coordinates: 34°03′49″N 118°29′07″W

- Ellwood Zimmerman House, designed and built by Craig Ellwood, photograph: Julius Shulman

General information
- Status: Demolished
- Completed: 1950
- Demolished: 2024

Technical details
- Floor area: 2,770 square feet (257 m^{2})

Design and construction
- Architecture firm: Craig Ellwood

The Ellwood Zimmerman House was an iconic mid-century modern house designed by Craig Ellwood built in Brentwood, Los Angeles, California in 1950. The architecturally-significant house was demolished in 2024, which drew criticism in the international press.

== History ==
The Zimmerman House was a low-slung, 2,770-square-foot (257 m^{2}), five-bedroom, three-bathroom house. According to the non-profit group USModernist, Martin and Eva Zimmerman commissioned the house in 1949. The Zimmermans sold the property to Richard Kelton in 1968; it was sold again in 1975 to Sam and Hilda Rolfe for $205,000.

In 2022, the property was purchased for $12.5 million by actor Chris Pratt and his wife Katherine Schwarzenegger; they subsequently had the building razed to make way for a 15,000-square-foot (1,400 m^{2}) mansion. The destruction of the house has been viewed as symptomatic of "systemic problems", where older mid-century houses are seen as less valuable than the plot of land they occupy. The gardens and landscaping designed by Garrett Eckbo were also destroyed during the demolition, "effectively turning the nearly one-acre lot into one flat slab."

== Description ==
Craig Ellwood, Zimmerman House living room, 1953. Photographed by Julius Shulman

The Zimmerman House was an early work by Ellwood, co-designed by Emiel Becksy. Ellwood was known for using industrial materials such as glass, steel and concrete in his architecture, which allowed his office to produce lower cost homes. The Zimmerman House was exemplary of the California modernist style indicative of Ellwood, and other architects of the time such as Charles and Ray Eames, Pierre Koenig and Richard Neutra. Garrett Eckbo designed the home's garden which was also destroyed.

The one-story home was known for its light-filled openness, featuring many sliding glass doors that provided views and passage into the garden. Similar to Ellwood's, Lappin House, the home was designed and arranged with a spine corridor, and featured a free-standing centrally located brick fireplace that separated the living room area from the dining room, similar to Case Study House 9 designed by Charles Eames and Eero Saarinen. Progressive Architecture magazine published a feature story on the home, and was considered a "showpiece" that was featured in other architectural magazines as well.

The home was located at 400 North Carmelina Avenue, near Sunset Boulevard in the Brentwood neighborhood. The Los Angeles Conservancy stated that at the time of demolition, the home was "highly intact and a noteworthy example of modernist design from this era." The façade of the structure featured recessed glazing creating a space, as described by Progressive Architecture as "completely open to the lawn and vistas to the rear." Arts & Architecture magazine described the façade as "four ten-foot glass doors, each sliding, open (to the) living-dining area to the terrace of textured concrete which leads to the plant garden. The bedrooms alternate on either side of the spine.

The home was described by Ellwood's daughter, Erin Ellwood, an Ojai, California-based interior designer, as a "time capsule."
