= Lucia Dewey Eames =

American designer (1930–2014)

Lucia Dewey Eames (1930–2014) was an American designer. Eames was born in St. Louis, Missouri to Charles Eames and his first wife, Catherine Woermann. She attended Radcliffe College. In the 1960s she began her design career. Well known works include Wind Harp, which she created in 1967 with her second husband, Aristides Demetrios, who is often solely credited for this work.

In 2022, Crate & Barrel released a line of homewares, based on her designs, including a prototype of a Hannukiah designed for the Jewish Museum in San Francisco in 1994.
