= Rodney Walker (architect) =

American architect

Rodney Walker (1910–1986) was an American midcentury modern designer and builder who specialized in residential architecture in the Southern California area. He contributed three designs to Arts & Architecture magazine's Case Study House program during the late 1940s (Case Study House 16, 17, and 18). Many of his homes were photographed by Julius Shulman for Arts & Architecture, Better Homes and Gardens, Architectural Record, Sunset, and the Los Angeles Times Home magazine.

== Life and career ==
Rodney Walker was born in Salt Lake City, Utah on September 15, 1910, and primarily raised in Ely, Nevada. He attended Pasadena City College before transferring to University of California Los Angeles where he received an athletic scholarship, graduated with a degree in art, and met his wife, Dorothea. In 1937, Rodney and Dorothea built their first house in West Los Angeles. Soon after, he went to work for Rudolph M. Schindler as a draftsman.

Over the next thirty years, Walker designed and built some 100 homes in Southern California. He designed numerous Case Study homes, exploring the adaptability of new ideas in small houses. He was known for his ability to minimize construction costs and for assisting the construction crew himself. Walker designed three of the Case Study houses (numbered 16, 17, and 18). These are sometimes confused with three Case Study houses designed by Craig Ellwood, which were also numbered 16 through 18.

From 1958, Walker lived in a 4,300-square-foot hilltop home in Ojai, California, that he had designed and built, and which he considered his masterpiece. After he discontinued home designing and contracting, he ran the Oaks Hotel in Ojai for 15 years and operated a store in which he sold jewelry that he crafted. Walker died on June 18, 1986, at his home in Ojai. He was survived by his wife, Dorothea; sons, Bruce, Mark, and Craig; and twin daughters, Ellen Langston and Lisa Kaufman.

== Legacy ==
The Walker Residence went up for sale in September 2011, asking $3.995 million.

Between 2012 and 2014, actor Zac Efron lived in a Walker house in Hollywood Hills West which was originally designed for the Case Study Program; the home was eventually built in 1947. It sold for $2.775 million in 2014.

Walker's Case Study House No. 18 was listed on the National Register of Historic Places in 2013.
