= White Memorial Fountain =

- The Claw
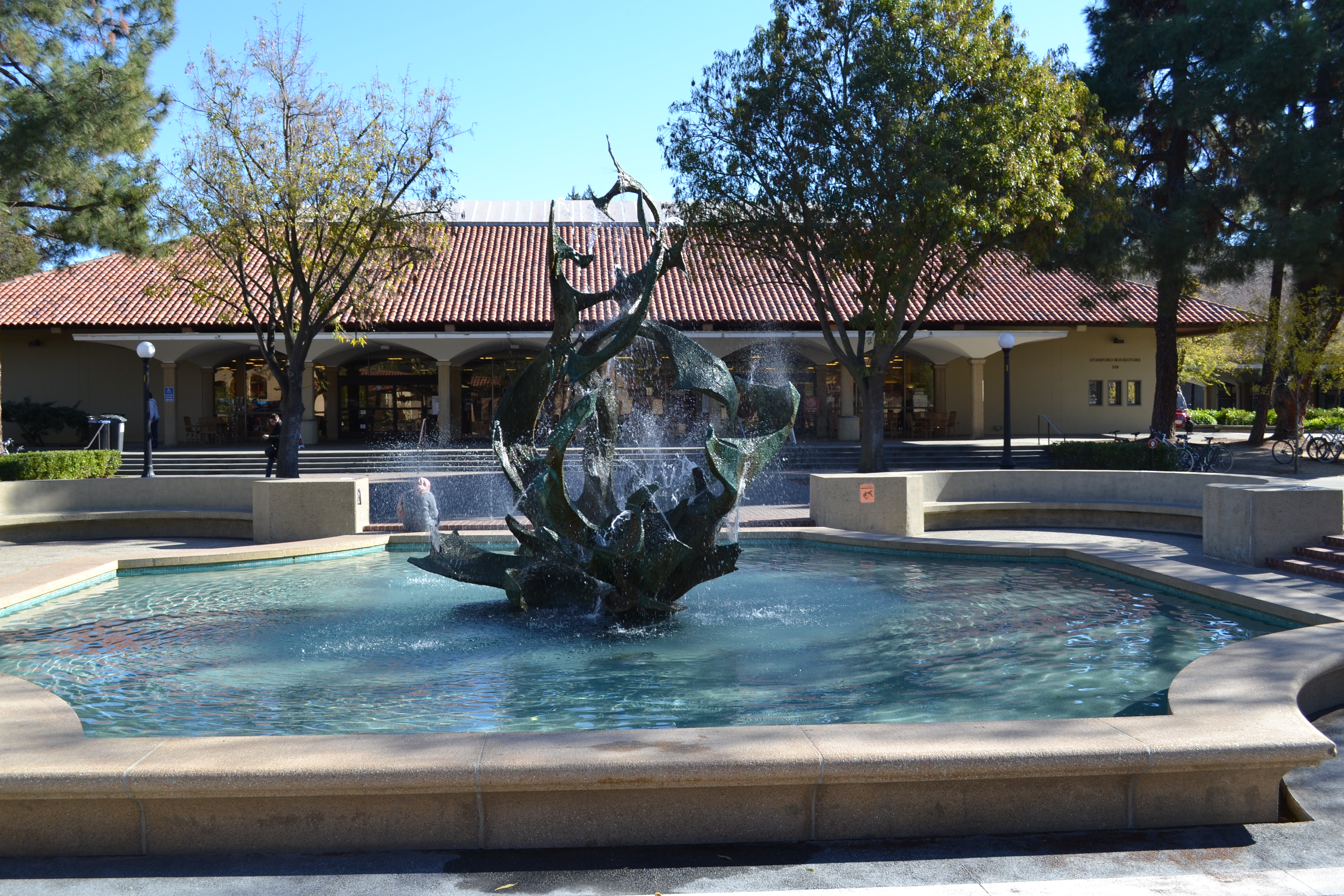
- The fountain in 2013
- Artist: Aristides Demetrios
- Year: 1964
- Location: Stanford, California, United States
- 37.42497°N 122.16939°W

White Memorial Fountain, also known as The Claw, is a fountain by Aristides Demetrios on the Stanford University campus in Stanford, California, United States. It was installed in 1964, and Demetrios returned to restore the fountain in 2011. It has 65 jets.

The fountain was commissioned by Mr. and Mrs. Raymond B. White to commemorate their sons, William N. and John B. White II.

The fountain is the site of the “Bearial of the Cal Bear," an annual Big Game tradition in which a teddy bear representing Cal’s mascot, Oski the Bear, is skewered at the apex of the Claw. The Claw is dyed red following Oski's execution.

== See also ==
- 1964 in art
