= Aristides Demetrios =

American sculptor (1932–2021)

Aristides Burton Demetrios (1932 – December 12, 2021) was an American sculptor.

== Life ==
Aristides Burton Demetrios, also known as "Aris," was born in 1932 and raised in Massachusetts, where he lived during childhood in Gloucester. His father George Demetrios was a classical sculptor, trained by Antoine Bourdelle, a student of Auguste Rodin. His mother Virginia Lee Burton was the renowned author and illustrator of children's books, including Mike Mulligan and His Steam Shovel, and The Little House, for which she won the prestigious Caldecott Medal. She was also a textile designer, founding the Folly Cove cooperative.

After graduating from Harvard College in 1953, Aris Demetrios served as an officer for three years in the US Navy. He studied art and sculpture at the George Demetrios School from 1956 to 1959. He studied at the University of California School of Architecture, in 1959.

In 1963, Demetrios won his first national sculpture competition, when his proposed design was selected for a major fountain commission on the campus of Stanford University (White Memorial Fountain, or "Mem Claw"). Soon after, he was chosen for a public art commission in Sacramento in front hof the County Courthouse. Next he was selected by David and Lucille Packard to design and fabricate a sculpture for the entry to the Monterey Bay Aquarium (Forms Sung In A Kelp Forest).

Demetrios lived in Santa Ynez, California. He died on December 12, 2021, in Santa Barbara, California, where he lived with his wife, Ilene Nagel. He was 89.

== Career ==
Demetrios successfully completed several monumental public sculptures, including Wind Harp (1967) with his wife, the designer Lucia Eames, in South San Francisco; Flame of Freedom,the Bataan War Memorial on the island of Corregidor; the 80' sculpture Cosmos, the fountain Pierine in New York City, Breakthrough, etc.) Wind Harp (1967) was designed for and installed on a hilltop in a South San Francisco industrial park. Originally it was called Cabot, Cabot and Forbes, after the developers of the industrial park. 92 feet tall and made of open metalwork of rusted steel, it is an aeolian harp, strummed by wind.

From the late 20th century, Demetrios designed, fabricated and installed a large number of commissioned works for the gardens of private collectors, including several bronze fountains. In addition, he had several gallery and museum shows featuring his figurative bronze sculptures, such as Trickster; his abstract bronze sculptures, such as The Cube, and his painted or patinaed steel sculptures, such as Tomorrow's Dreams. Many of these pieces are held in private collections.

In 2002, Demetrios won the "Santa Barbara Beautiful Award" for the most beautiful work of public art. It was given to acknowledge his 18' bronze fountain, Mentors, a centerpiece at Santa Barbara City College, in a site overlooking the Pacific Ocean. The Fountain was donated to the campus by Eli Luria and Michael Towbes, two Santa Barbara philanthropists. Each owns other works by Demetrios.
