= Pergine Valdarno =

- Frazione
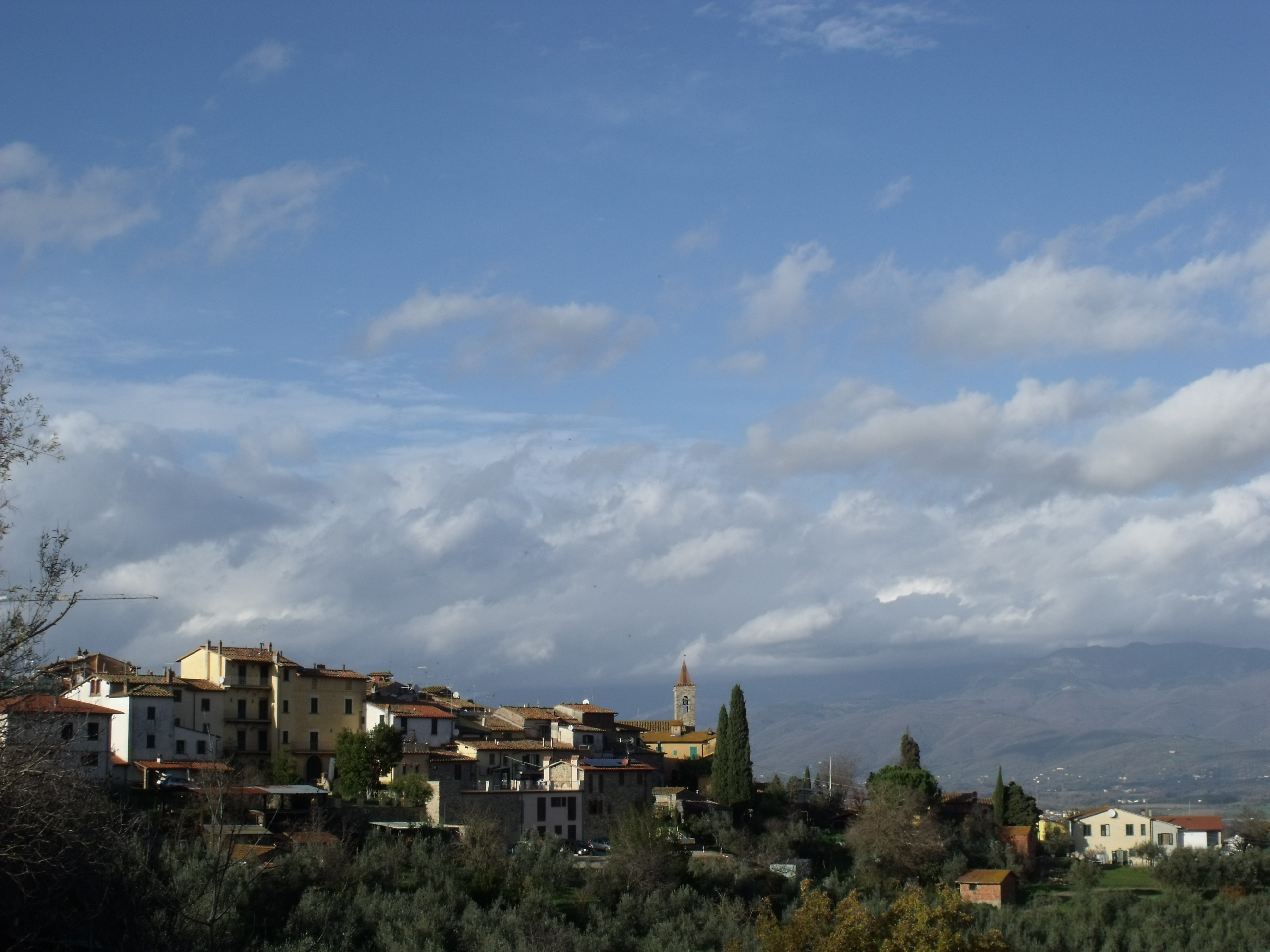
- Panorama of Pergine Valdarno

- Location of Pergine Valdarno in Italy
- Coordinates: 43°28′N 11°41′E
- Country: Italy
- Region: Tuscany
- Province: Arezzo (AR)
- Comune: Laterina Pergine Valdarno

Area
  - Total: 46.6 km^{2} (18.0 sq mi)
- Elevation: 361 m (1,184 ft)

Population (31 December 2010)
  - Total: 3,270
  - Density: 70.2/km^{2} (182/sq mi)
- Demonym: Perginesi
- Time zone: UTC+1 (CET)
  - Summer (DST): UTC+2 (CEST)
- Postal code: 52020
- Dialing code: 0575
- Website: Official website

Pergine Valdarno is a frazione of Laterina Pergine Valdarno in the Province of Arezzo in the Italian region Tuscany, located about 50 kilometres (31 mi) southeast of Florence and about 15 kilometres (9 mi) west of Arezzo. The American architect Craig Ellwood died there on May 30, 1992.
