= Craig Ellwood =

American architect (1922–1992)

- Born: Jon Nelson Burke; April 22, 1922; Clarendon, Texas, U.S.
- Died: May 30, 1992 (aged 70); Pergine Valdarno, Italy
- Occupation: Architect
- Spouse(s): Faith Irene Walker Gloria Henry (m. 1949; div. 1977) Anita Eubank Leslie Hyland (m. 1985)
- Children: 4
- Practice: Craig Ellwood Design (established 1949) unlicensed architect
- Buildings: 1953 Case Study House 16 in Bel Air, California (1952–53); Case Study House 17B (Hoffman House) in Beverly Hills, California (1954–56); Case Study House 18 (Fields House) in Beverly Hills, California (1955–58); Kubly House in Pasadena, California (1965)
- Design: The Milton Lappin House in the Cheviot Hills (1948); The Epstein House in Los Angeles (1949); The Meyer House in Los Angeles (1950)

Craig Ellwood (born Jon Nelson Burke; April 22, 1922 – May 30, 1992) was an American architect whose career spanned the early 1950s through the mid-1970s in Los Angeles. Although untrained as an architect, he fashioned an influential persona and career through a talent for good design, self-promotion, and ambition. He was recognized professionally for fusing of the formalism of Mies van der Rohe with the informal style of California modernists.

== Early life ==
Ellwood was born Jon Nelson Burke in Clarendon, Texas, on April 22, 1922. Along with many others in the 1920s, his family moved west, following U.S. Route 66 and finally settling in Los Angeles in 1937. There, as Johnnie Burke, he attended Belmont High School; he was class president before graduating in 1940. He and his brother Cleve both joined the U.S. Army Air Corps in 1942, and he served as a B-24 radio operator based with his brother in Victorville, California, until his discharge in 1946.

== Career ==
After his discharge from the Army, Ellwood returned to Los Angeles and set up a company with his brother Cleve and two friends from the war, the Marzicola brothers, one of whom had a contractor's license. The four men called their firm "Craig Ellwood" after a liquor store called Lords and Elwood located in front of their offices. Burke later legally changed his name to "Craig Ellwood".

In 1948, he joined the firm Lamport Cofer Salzman (L.C.S.) as a construction cost estimator, having acquired this skill during his work for the Craig Ellwood Company. Ellwood also studied structural engineering through UCLA extension night school for five years. He became increasingly involved in design and architecture, resulting in Ellwood's first commissions, all for residences.

Ellwood established Craig Ellwood Design in 1951. There, Ellwood would provide the commissions and the vision, and it was up to USC-trained architect Robert Theron Peters, and later others, to provide the technical realization, drawings and the required sign-off of a licensed architect. Early projects included Case Study House 16 in 1952. The designs were well received by both the trade and potential clients, often receiving favorable coverage in influential publications like John Entenza's Arts & Architecture, often arranged for by Ellwood personally. Thus the firm received a growing stream of both residential and commercial commissions, and Ellwood's style matured to fully embrace the concepts put forth by International Style architects, particularly Mies van der Rohe.

By the late-1950s, though not a licensed architect, Ellwood was nonetheless a sought-after university lecturer, eventually giving a series of talks at Yale University, and teaching at the University of Southern California and California State Polytechnic University, Pomona's Department of Architecture.

Though Ellwood's office expanded with the size and number of his commissions, it was never a particularly profitable enterprise. It continued through the mid-1970s, with several notable projects, including the master plan for the Rand Corporation's headquarters in Santa Monica, California, a number of Xerox and IBM offices, and the trademark "bridge building" dramatically spanning an arroyo and a roadway at Art Center College of Design in Pasadena.

As published in the 1976, the Art Center building is recognized as the work of Craig Ellwood Associates, with James Tyler as design architect and Stephen Woolley as project architect. Some sources have sought to re-credit this building solely to Tyler, who had worked for John Sugden (a former associate of Mies) and was the architect of the Art Center addition, completed in 1991. The practice closed in 1977 and Ellwood retired to Italy to focus on painting and on restoring a farm house near Ambra.

== Personal life ==
Elwood's first wife was Faith Irene "Bobbie" Walker. In 1949, he married actress Gloria Henry, and they had three children named Jeffrey, Adam, and Erin; the latter also became a designer. The two divorced in 1977. He then married Anita Eubank and moved to Pergine Valdarno. After his divorce from Eubank, he and his fourth wife Leslie Hyland had a daughter.

Craig Ellwood was a colorful personality. "The cars he drove, the clothes he wore, the women he dated, the cigarettes he smoked: Craig Ellwood was conspicuous wherever he went." (Boyd, Michael, Erin Ellwood, co-editor, photography by Richard Powers, p. 233.)

== Death ==
Ellwood died at the age of 70 in Pergine Valdarno on May 30, 1992.

== Significant projects ==
Projects in California:

- 1948 : Lappin House; Cheviot Hills (Los Angeles).
- 1949 : Hale House; Beverly Hills.*
- 1950 : Ellwood-Zimmerman House; Brentwood (Los Angeles). Site bought and house demolished by Chris Pratt and Katherine Schwarzenegger in 2024.
- 1951–53 : The New Case Study House 16 (Salzman House); Bel Air, Los Angeles.
- 1953 : Charles and Gerry Bobertz Residence; San Diego.
- Year? : Courtyard Apartments; Hollywood.
- 1954–56 : Case Study House 17B (Hoffman House); Beverly Hills.
- 1955–58 : Case Study House 18 (Fields House); Beverly Hills.
- 1955 : Smith House; Los Angeles.
- 1955 : Hunt House; Malibu.
- 1956 : South Bay Bank; Los Angeles.
- 1958–60 : Carson-Roberts Office Building; West Hollywood.
- 1960–61 : Daphne House; Hillsborough.
- 1965 : Kubly House; Pasadena. Built for President of Art Center College of Design, Don and Sally Kubly.
- 1966–69 : Scientific Data Systems, various buildings and offices; El Segundo and Pomona.
- 1968 : Max Palevsky House; Palm Springs.
- 1976 : Art Center College of Design (Hillside Campus); Pasadena.

== Bibliography ==
- Craig Ellwood Paintings, published by Converso Gallery, 2004, essay by Jeffrey Head
- "What Does Post-Modernism Mean to You?" L.A. Architect, March 1976.

== Gallery ==
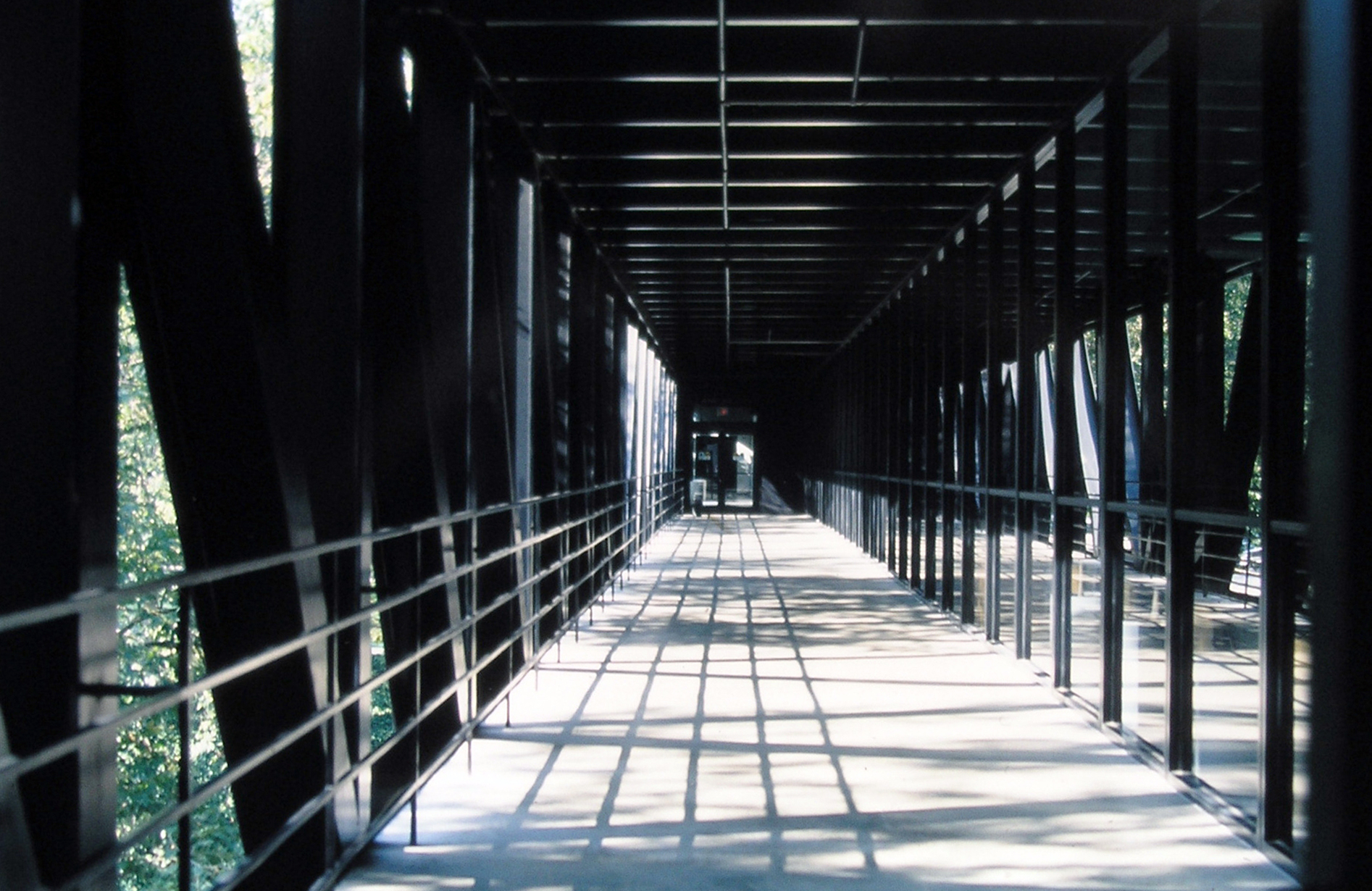
Art Center College of Design, Pasadena, California, 1970-1976

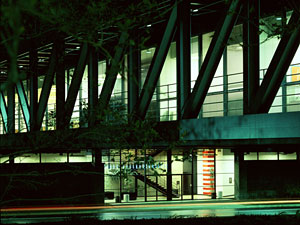
"Bridge Building" at Art Center College of Design in Pasadena

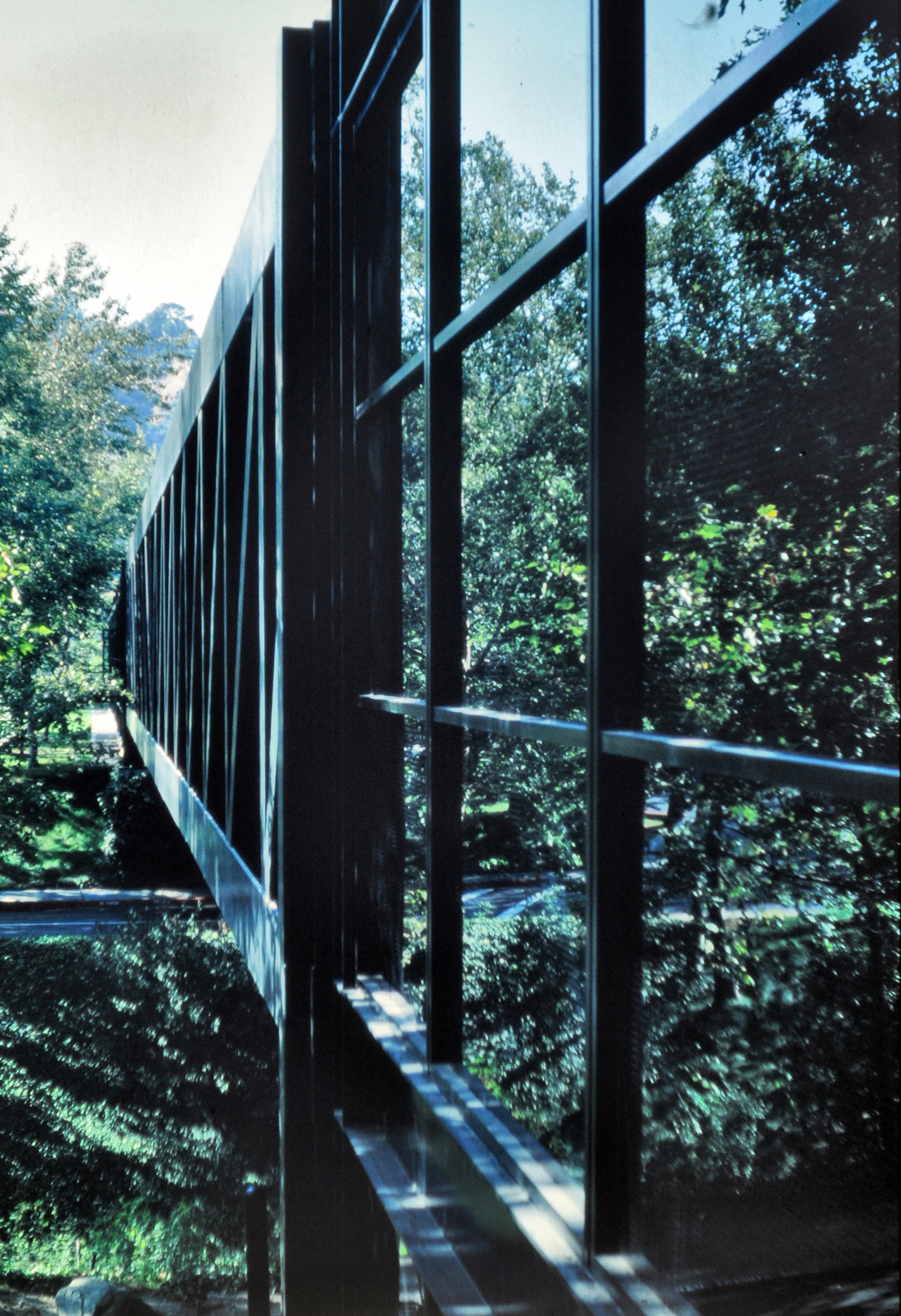
Art Center College of Design, Pasadena, California, 1970-1976
