= Sonic Bloom =

Sonic Bloom or Sonicbloom may refer to:

- Tin Foil Phoenix, a band that released its first EP under the name Sonic Bloom
- "Sonic Bloom", a single by Tripping Daisy from their album Jesus Hits Like The Atom Bomb, later covered by The Polyphonic Spree
- Hiromi's Sonicbloom, group formed by jazz pianist Hiromi Uehara
- Sonic Bloom (sculpture), a solar-powered art installation created by Dan Corson in Seattle, Washington, U.S.
