= Galton board =

Device invented by Francis Galton

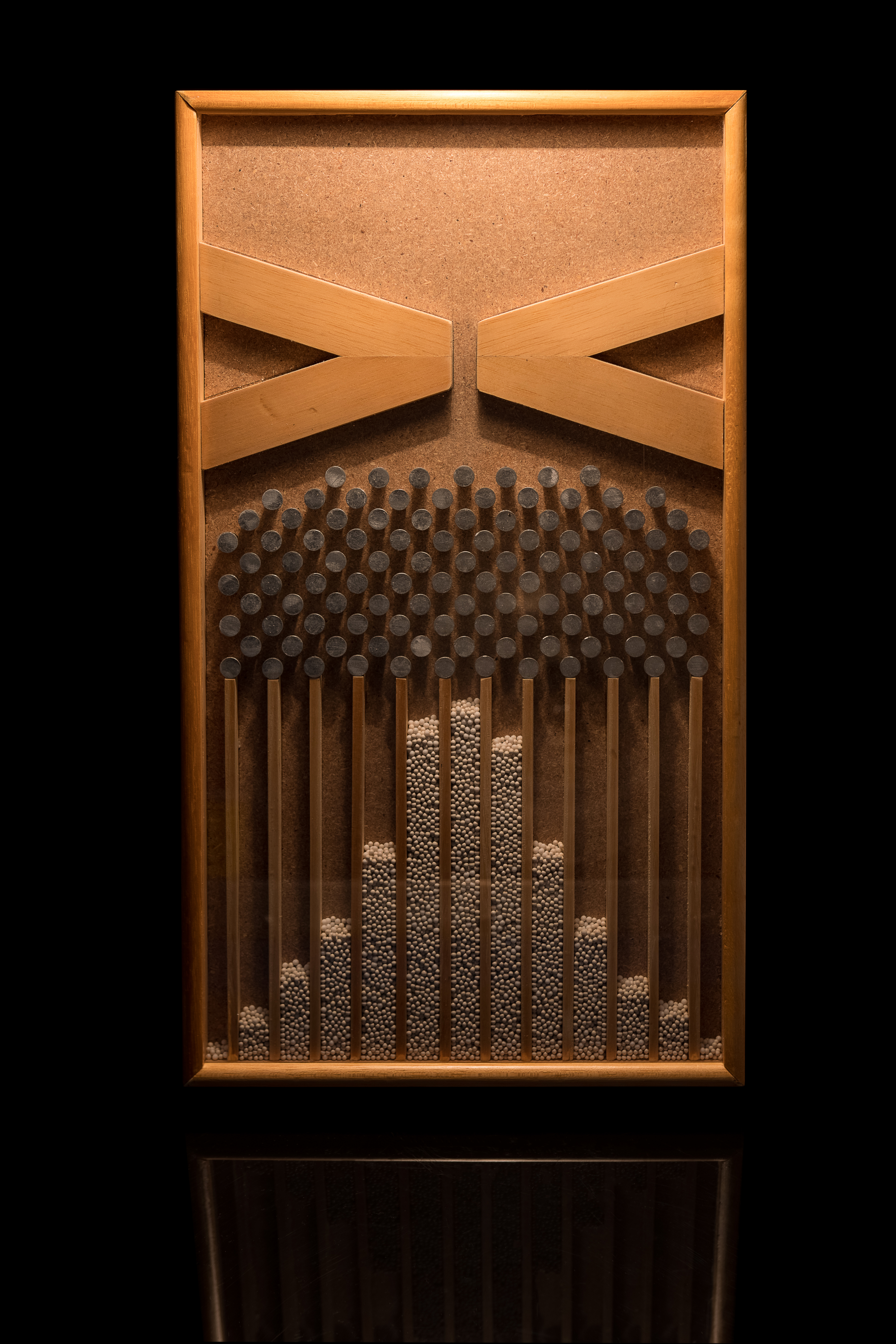
Galton box

A Galton box demonstrated

The Galton board, also known as the Galton box or quincunx or bean machine (or incorrectly Dalton board), is a device invented by Francis Galton to demonstrate the central limit theorem, in particular that with sufficient sample size the binomial distribution approximates a normal distribution.

Galton designed it to illustrate his idea of regression to the mean, which he called "reversion to mediocrity" and made part of his eugenist ideology.

== Description ==
The Galton board consists of a vertical board with interleaved rows of pegs. Beads are dropped from the top and, when the device is level, bounce either left or right as they hit the pegs. Eventually they are collected into bins at the bottom, where the height of bead columns accumulated in the bins approximate a bell curve. Overlaying Pascal's triangle onto the pins shows the number of different paths that can be taken to get to each bin.

Large-scale working models of this device created by Charles and Ray Eames can be seen in the Mathematica: A World of Numbers... and Beyond exhibits permanently on view at the Boston Museum of Science, the New York Hall of Science, or the Henry Ford Museum. The Ford Museum machine was displayed at the IBM Pavilion during 1964-65 New York World's Fair, later appearing at Pacific Science Center in Seattle. Another large-scale version is displayed in the lobby of Index Fund Advisors in Irvine, California.

Boards can be constructed for other distributions by changing the shape of the pins or biasing them towards one direction, and even bimodal boards are possible. A board for the log-normal distribution (common in many natural processes, particularly biological ones), which uses isosceles triangles of varying widths to 'multiply' the distance the bead travels instead of fixed sizes steps which would 'sum', was constructed by Jacobus Kapteyn while studying and popularizing the statistics of the log-normal in order to help visualize it and demonstrate its plausibility. As of 1963, it was preserved in the University of Groningen. There is also an improved log-normal machine that uses skewed triangles whose right sides are longer, and thus avoiding shifting the median of the beads to the left.

== Distribution of the beads ==
If a bead bounces to the right k times on its way down (and to the left on the remaining pegs) it ends up in the kth bin counting from the left. Denoting the number of rows of pegs in a Galton Board by n, the number of paths to the kth bin on the bottom is given by the binomial coefficient ${n\choose k}$. Note that the leftmost bin is the 0-bin, next to it is the 1-bin, etc. and the furthest one to the right is the n-bin - making thus the total number of bins equal to n+1 (each row does not need to have more pegs than the number that identifies the row itself, e.g. the first row has 1 peg, the second 2 pegs, until the n-th row that has n pegs which correspond to the n+1 bins). If the probability of bouncing right on a peg is p (which equals 0.5 on an unbiased level machine) the probability that the ball ends up in the kth bin equals ${n\choose k} p^k (1-p)^{n-k}$. This is the probability mass function of a binomial distribution. The number of rows correspond to the size of a binomial distribution in number of trials, while the probability p of each pin is the binomial's p.

According to the central limit theorem (more specifically, the de Moivre–Laplace theorem), the binomial distribution approximates the normal distribution provided that the number of rows and the number of balls are both large. Varying the rows will result in different standard deviations or widths of the bell-shaped curve or the normal distribution in the bins.

Another interpretation more accurate from the physical view is given by the entropy: since the energy that is carried by every falling bead is finite, so even that on any tip their collisions are chaotic because the derivative is undefined (there is no way to previously figure out for which side is going to fall), the mean and variance of each bean is restricted to be finite (they will never bound out of the box), and the Gaussian shape arises because it is the maximum entropy probability distribution for a continuous process with defined mean and variance. The rise of the normal distribution could be interpreted as that all possible information carried by each bean related to which path it has travelled has been already completely lost through their downhill collisions.

== Examples ==
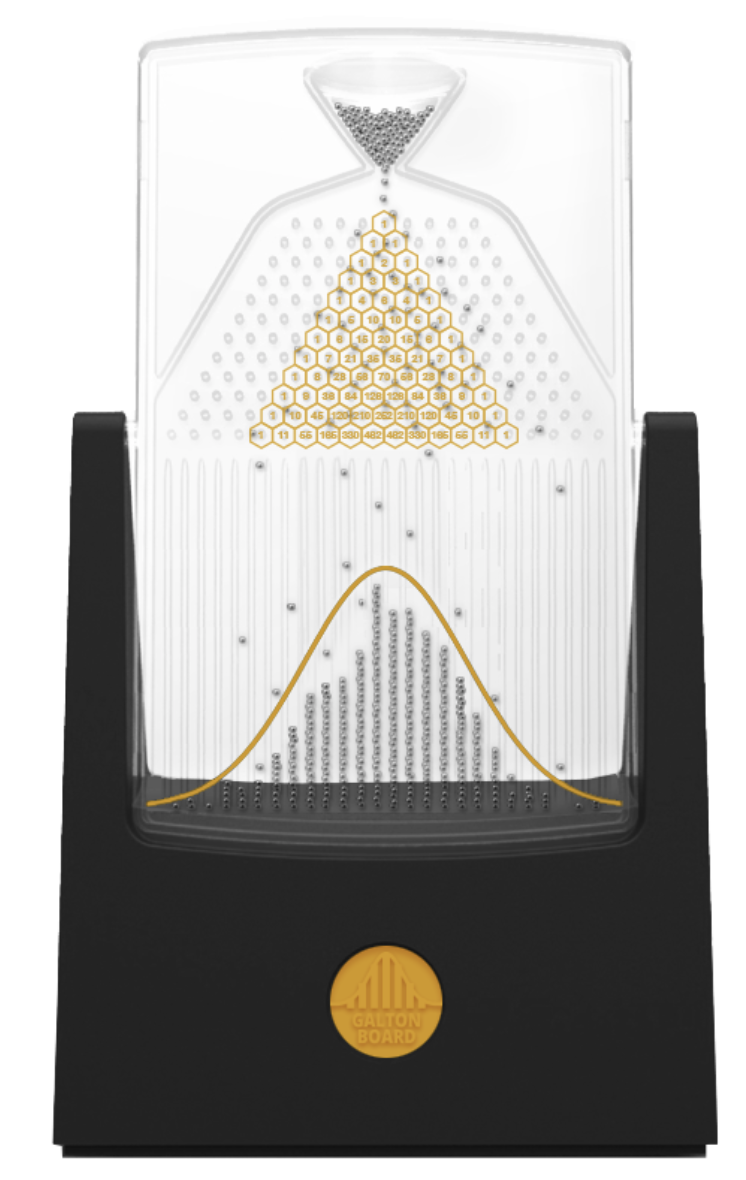
Galton Board (7.5 in by 4.5 in)

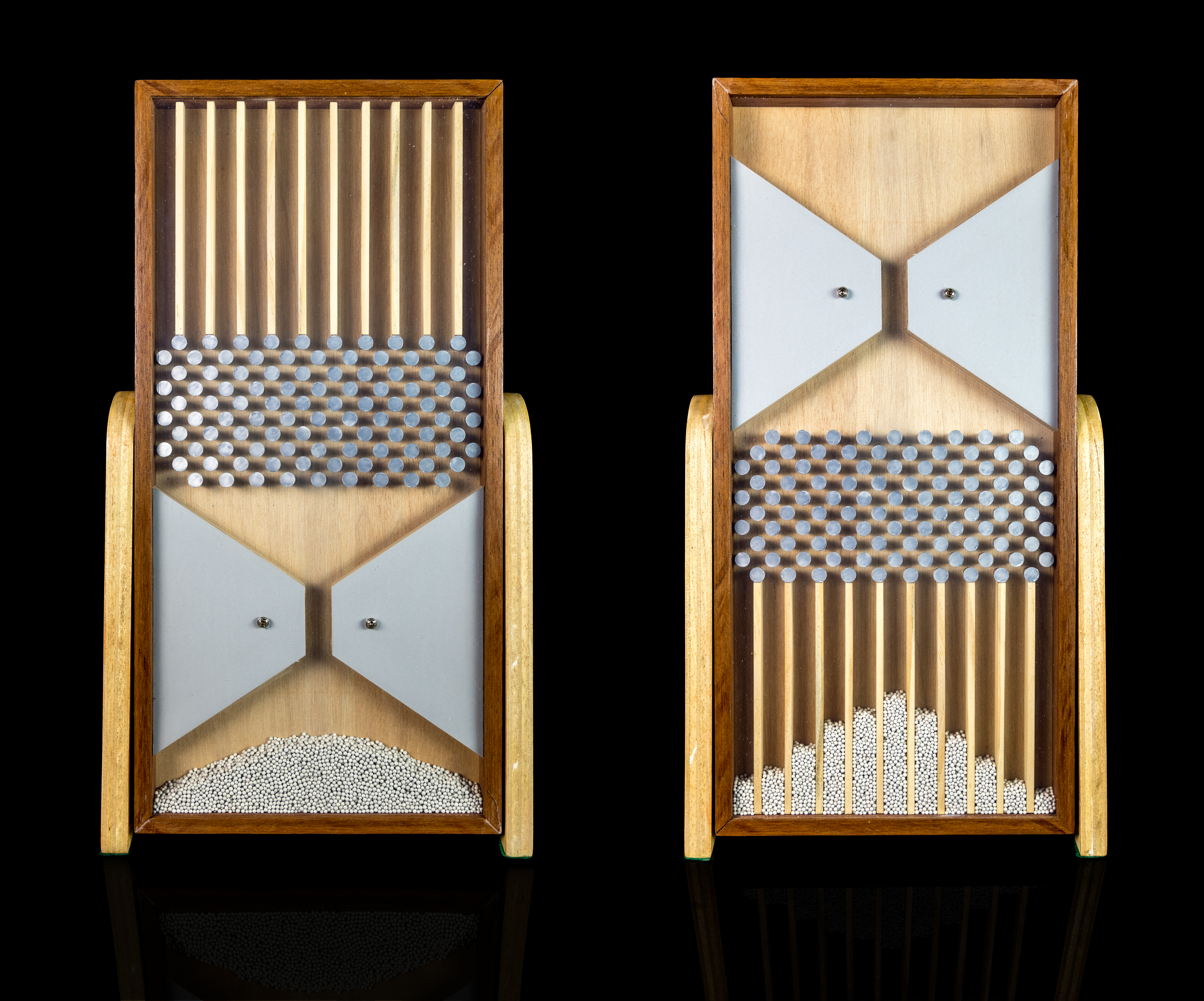
Before and after the spin

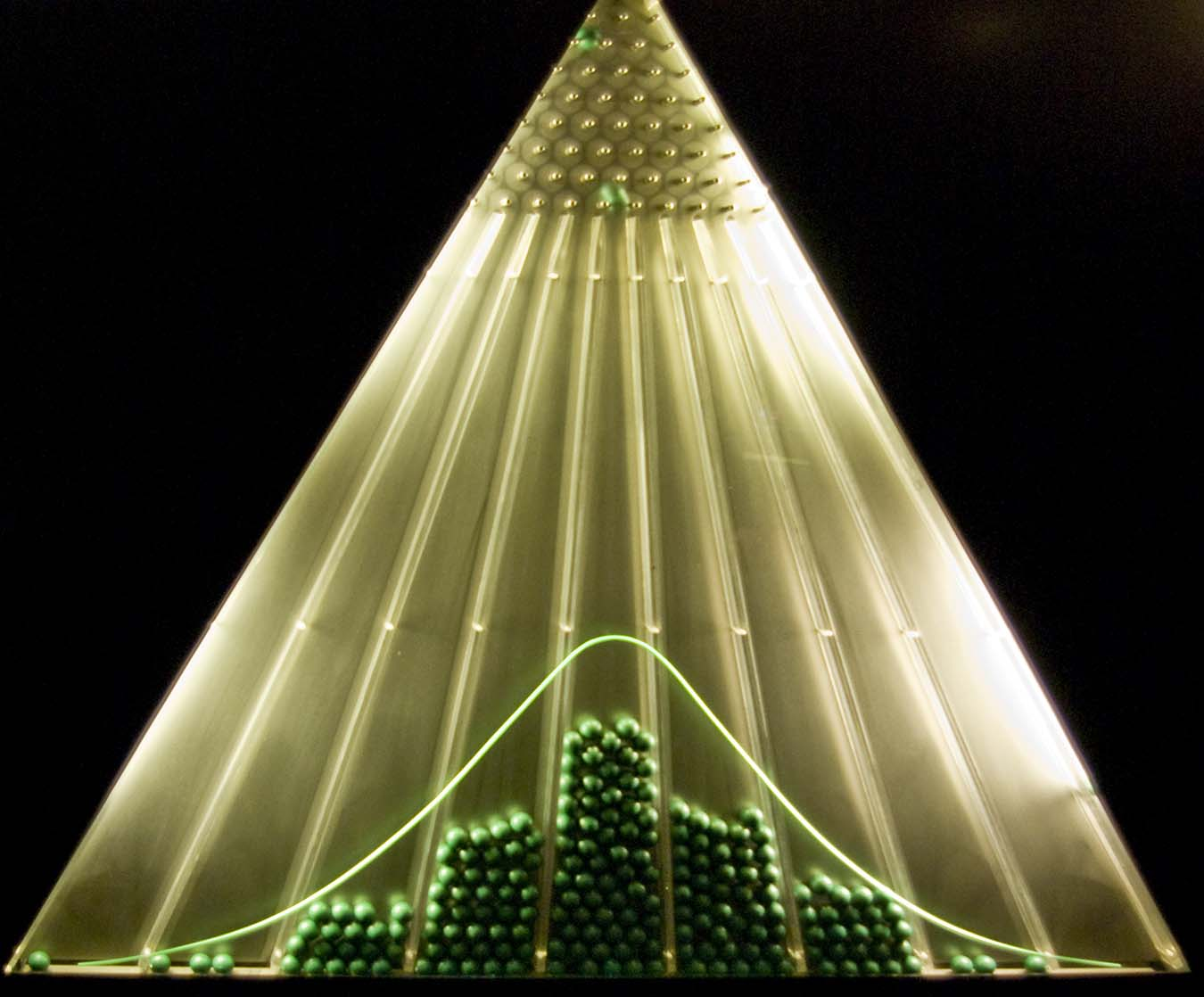
A working replica of the machine (following a slightly modified design)

== History ==
Francis Galton designed his board as part of a presentation for the Royal Institution Discourses on February 27, 1874. His goal was to promote the use of ranking instead of measurement in statistics, so that qualities such as intelligence could be assigned numbers without requiring experimental data. The piling of the balls into a normal distribution was supposed to illustrate how a mean value would emerge from multiple tests.

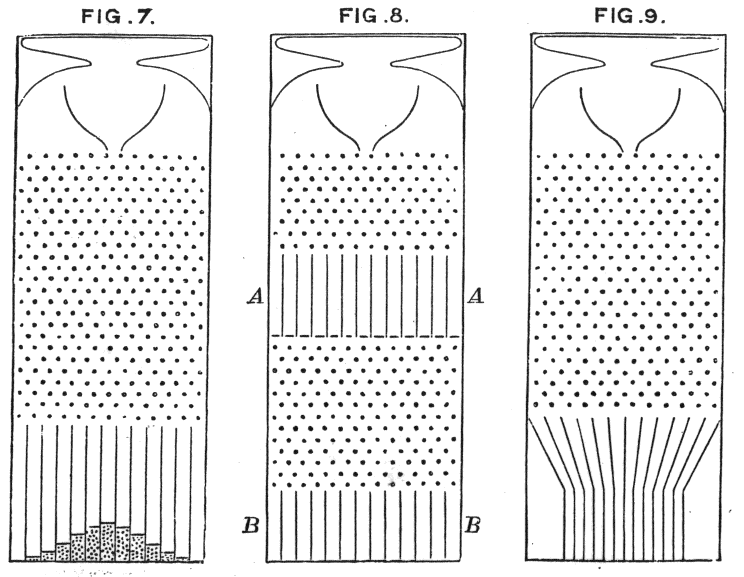
The quincunx, as drawn by Francis Galton

Francis Galton wrote in 1889 his book Natural Inheritance:

Order in Apparent Chaos: I know of scarcely anything so apt to impress the imagination as the wonderful form of cosmic order expressed by the Law of Frequency of Error. The law would have been personified by the Greeks and deified, if they had known of it. It reigns with serenity and in complete self-effacement amidst the wildest confusion. The huger the mob, and the greater the apparent anarchy, the more perfect is its sway. It is the supreme law of Unreason. Whenever a large sample of chaotic elements are taken in hand and marshalled in the order of their magnitude, an unsuspected and most beautiful form of regularity proves to have been latent all along.

However, Galton also wished to demonstrate that extreme values of intelligence result from heredity, in apparent contradiction with his experiment since it produces extreme values as dispersion from randomness alone. Aware of this issue, he tried to address it in 1875 by arguing that his box did not reflect situations where bias would be introduced by what he called a main influence factor.

In a 1877 letter to George Darwin, Galton described a second version of the board, with two stages, where the compartments at the bottom of the highest stage had small trapdoors that would allow the balls of one chosen compartment to fall through the second stage. His goal was to illustrate his concept of "reversion to mediocrity", i.e. that without marriage control the "best" parts of the population would mix with the "mediocre", so that their offspring would gradually revert towards an average value. This version, however, was not built.

== Games ==
Several games have been developed using the idea of pins changing the route of balls or other objects:

- Bagatelle
- Pachinko
- Payazzo
- Peggle
- Pinball
- Plinko
- The Wall

It is suggested that bagatelle provided inspiration for Galton's device.
