= Dan Corson =

American artist (born 1964)

Dan Corson (born 1964) is an artist living in Hawaii and is a former member of the Seattle Arts Commission. He works in the field of public art, creating large-scale, concept-driven works installed in urban environments including in parks, railway stations, art galleries, meditation chambers, at intersections, under freeways, and on sidewalks. His approach is a mixture of sculpture, installation, theatrical design, architecture, and landscape design. Media include metal, glass, concrete, fiberglass, gravel, LEDs, lasers, neon, solar panels, radar detectors, photo-voltaic cells, infrared cameras, motors, searchlights, and occasionally elements such as fire, water, and smoke. His work frequently incorporates cutting-edge technology in lighting, sound, and other electronic media.

== Career ==
Corson served as the first Artist-in-Residence for the City of Seattle's "% for Arts program" in 2001. His work is often interactive and incorporates elements such as photoelectric switches which the spectator can trigger and cause the artwork to respond. Typical is Emerald Aura a temporary laser sculpture in Memphis Tennessee that used Infrared cameras and surveillance software to track pedestrians and project the processed computer generated images back onto the people in real time. This installation is typical of Corson’s work in the way that it combine artistic expression with an implied statement about our culture.

Some of Corson's works interact not with people, but with the environment. Examples include Nepenthes, whimsical fiberglass sculptures on sidewalks in Portland that are covered with photo-voltaic cells that glow at night, and Sonic Bloom at Seattle's Pacific Science Center which features solar panels and gigantic metal flowers that light up at night. The flowers also hum when people approach them. In 1994 the city of Seattle selected Corson to integrate art into the new Cedar River Watershed Education Center. In characteristic fashion he exploited the natural resources of the site–for example using falling water to create a musical artwork in the Rain Drum Courtyard.

His theatrical set and lighting designs have been featured at the ACT Theatre, Annex Theatre, and On the Boards in Seattle, at Young Vic in London, and at the San Diego Rep and the Old Globe in San Diego.

== Life ==
Corson was born in Glendale, California. He received a Bachelor of Arts in theatrical design from San Diego State University in 1986 and a Master of Fine Arts in sculpture from the University of Washington in 1992. He was a Scholar at the Skowhegan School of Painting and Sculpture in 1991. He studied glass-blowing and neon fabrication at the Pilchuck Glass School in 1993, 1994, and 1996.

After graduating from San Diego State University, he went to London for two years doing theater design and working with lighting designer David Hersey.

Corson has been together with his husband Berndt Stugger since 1997 and their Washington State Civil Union was converted into an official Marriage in 2014. Both Corson and Stugger are avid gardeners with a passion for tropical gardening. This botanical fascination can clearly be seen in Corson’s work. In 2010 they purchased some old sugarcane land in Hawaii Island and have transformed it into a small cacao farm.

== Works ==
Corson has often collaborated in public art projects, for example working with fellow artists Norie Sato, Sheila Klein, and Tad Savinar on Seattle's Sound Transit Link Light Rail project in 1998. Corson is a prolific artist and it is not practical to list all of his creations; a selected list of works is shown below.

- 2002 Wave Rave Cave, Seattle
- 2003 Antennae Reeds, Seattle (with Norie Sato)
- 2005 Rain Drum Courtyard, North Bend, Washington
- 2007 Safety Spires, Seattle
- 2007 Emerald Laser Lawn, Fort Lauderdale, Florida
- 2007 Luminous Conjunctions, Fort Lauderdale, Florida
- 2008 Emerald Aura, Memphis, Tennessee
- 2009 The Root, Bellevue, Washington
- 2009 Grotesque Arabesque, Seattle
- 2009 Empyrean Passage, West Hollywood, California
- 2009 Oscillating Field, Seattle
- 2013 Nepenthes, Portland, Oregon
- 2013 Sonic Bloom, Seattle
- 2013 Rays, Council Bluffs, Iowa
- 2015 Shifting Topographies, Oakland, California
- 2015 Coherence, Des Moines, Iowa
- 2015 Nebulous, Seattle
- 2015 Sensing YOU and Sensing WATER, San Jose, California

== Awards ==
- 1998 Artist Trust GAP award
- 2001 PAN Year in Review Award for Cedar River Watershed Visitors Center
- 2003 ASLA Washington Chapter Honor Award
- 2004 ASLA Design Award of Merit for Cedar River Watershed Education Center
- 2006 National AIA Housing Committee Award and AIA 2004 Seattle Honor Award
- 2006 PAN Year in Review Award for Wave Rave Cave
- 2007 PAN Year in Review Award for Emerald Laser Lawn
- 2007 PAN Year in Review Award for Safety Spires (in collaboration with Norie Sato)
- 2009 PAN Year in Review Award for Empyrean Passage
- 2010 PAN Year in Review Award for Emerald Aura and Oscillating Field
