= Sea Monster House =

The Sea Monster House that was on display at Pacific Science Center was a combination of two separate houses owned by the Scow family. The houses were originally created and constructed on Gilford Island, near Vancouver Island in the early 1900s. The shell of the house and front design are replicas of the original Sea Monster House, the original was built around 1900. The posts and beams in the exhibit are the actual posts and beams of the Raven House, also owned by the Scow family, which was built around 1916. The house is a traditional Kwakwaka'wakw home consisting of four large cedar posts and four large cedar crossbeams surrounded by a shell cedar planks. The front of the house is painted in traditional Kwakiutl-style formlines. "Sea Monster" refers to a myth wherein a large sea creature emerges from Blackfish Sound and contributes to early Kwakiutl society.

The four house posts and cross beams of this house were on display at Pacific Science Center from the late 1960s to the early 1990s when the owner, John Hauberg, requested that they be moved to the Seattle Art Museum for permanent display. The shell of the house, including the recreation of the original Sea Monster design is now on display at the Burke Museum on the campus of the University of Washington in Seattle. The replica of the Whale pole is on display at the Convention Center in downtown Seattle.
