= Pachinko =

Japanese arcade gambling game

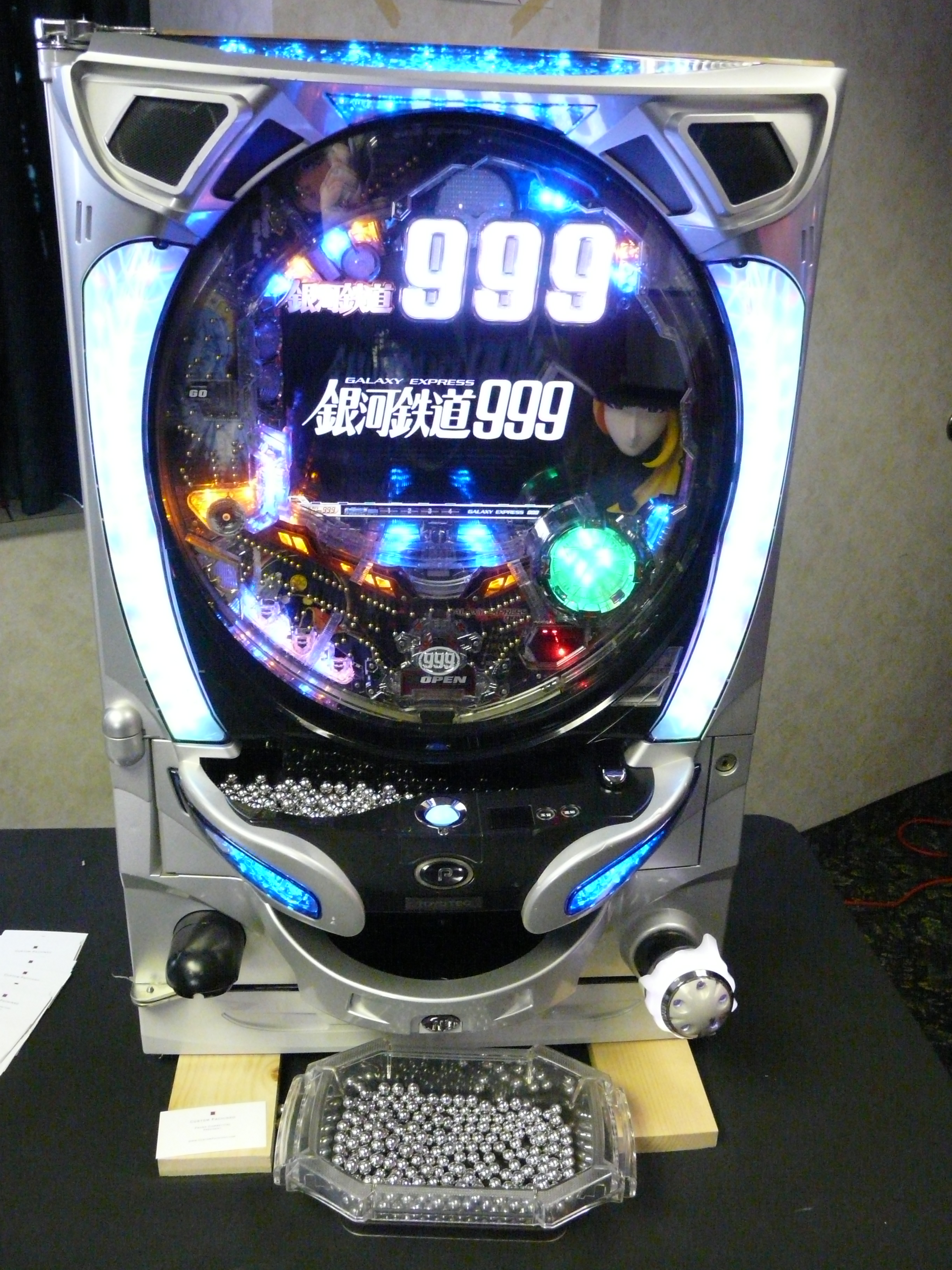
A modern pachinko machine, Galaxy Express 999-themed

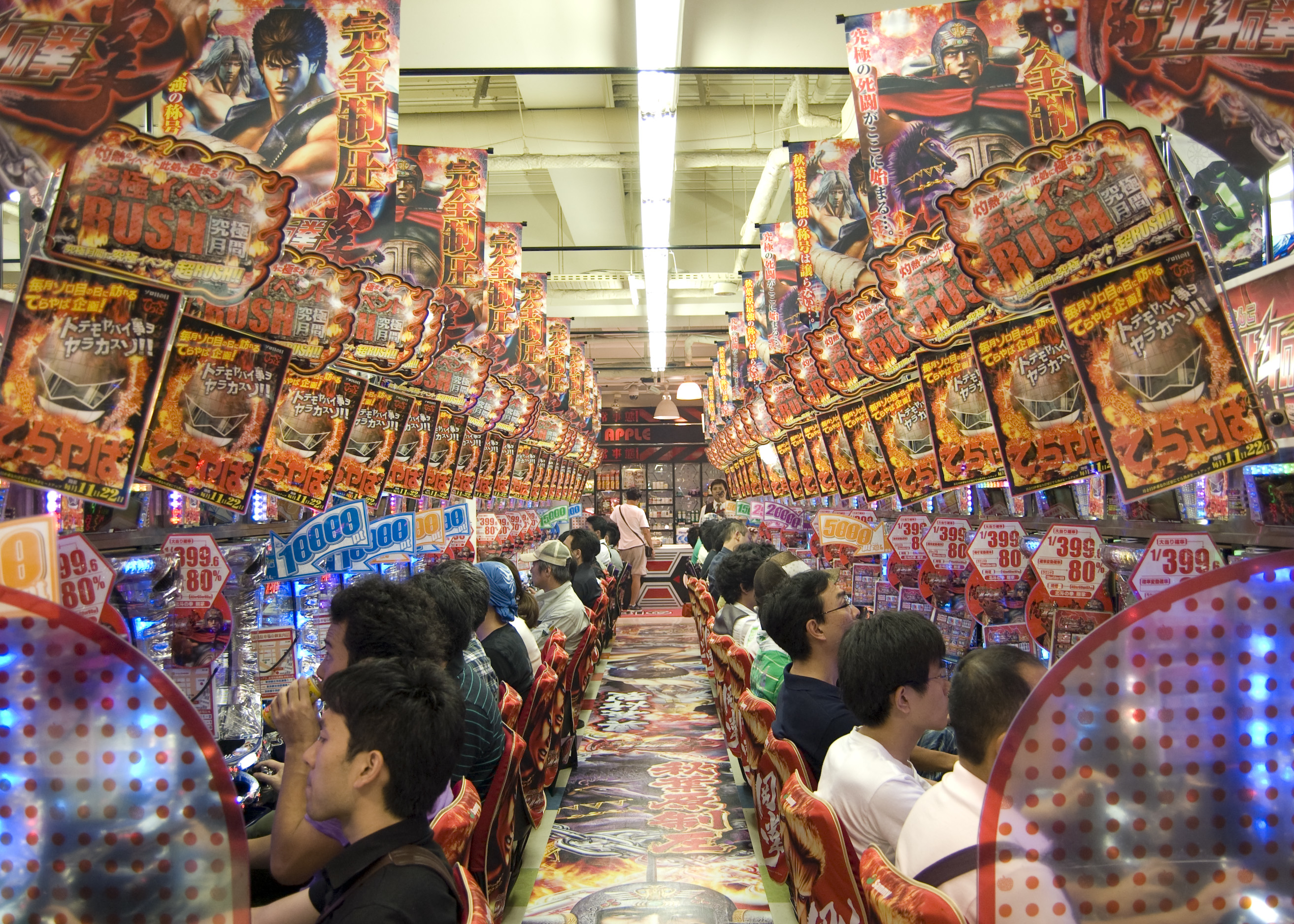
A pachinko parlor in Tokyo

Pachinko (Japanese: パチンコ; pronounced [patɕiŋko]) is a mechanical game originating in Japan that is used as an arcade game and, much more frequently, for gambling. Pachinko fills a niche in Japanese gambling comparable to that of the slot machine in the Western world as a form of low-stakes, low-strategy gambling.

Pachinko parlors are widespread in Japan, and usually also feature a number of slot machines (called pachislo or pachislots); these venues look and operate similarly to casinos. Modern pachinko machines have both mechanical and electrical components.

Gambling for cash is illegal de jure in Japan, but the widespread popularity of low-stakes pachinko in Japanese society has enabled a specific legal loophole allowing it to exist. Pachinko balls won from games cannot be exchanged directly for money in the parlor, nor can they be removed from the premises or exchanged with other parlors. However, they can be legally traded to the parlor for so-called "special prize" tokens (tokushu keihin (特殊景品)), which can in turn be "sold" for cash to a separate vendor off-premises. These vendors (ostensibly independent from, but often owned by, the parlor owner) then sell the tokens back to the parlor at the same price paid for them—plus a small commission, creating a cash profit—without technically violating the law.‍

By 1994, the pachinko market in Japan was valued at ¥30 trillion‍ (nearly US$300 billion; equivalent to $590 billion in 2025‍). In 1999, sales and revenue from pachinko parlors contributed 5.6% of Japan's ¥500 trillion GDP, and they employed over 330,000 people, 0.52% of all those employed in Japan.‍ However, the sales amount of these pachinko parlors is calculated based on the total amount that customers rented pachinko balls from pachinko parlors. It is said that on average, about 85% of the money spent by customers in pachinko parlors is returned to the customers, so the sales of pachinko parlors are said to be about 15% of the statistical amount.‍ In 2015, Japan's pachinko market generated more gambling revenue than that of Macau, Las Vegas, and Singapore combined.‍ Pachinko gambling's grey-market nature and tremendous profit historically resulted in considerable infiltration by yakuza, who used it as a vehicle for money laundering and racketeering.

Since the 1990s, however, this has been less of an issue due to police crackdowns.‍ There were over 7 million pachinkos around the world in 2018 with more than half of them being in Japan.‍ In recent years, the pachinko market (the total amount of pachinko balls rented by customers from pachinko parlors) and the number of pachinko parlors in Japan have both continued to decline. The market size in 2022 was ¥14.6 trillion, less than half of the ¥35 trillion in 2005 when the market was at its peak, and the number of pachinko parlors in 2022 was 7,665, less than half of the 18,244 in 1997, when the number of parlors was at its peak.‍

Following a number of years of decline of parlours and machines, the number of pachinko machines in Japan dropped to around 2.5 million by the end of 2019.‍

== Description ==
A pachinko machine resembles a vertical pinball machine, but is different from Western pinball in several ways. It uses small (11-millimetre (2/5 in) diameter) steel balls, which the owner (usually a "pachinko parlor", featuring many individual games in rows) rents to the player, while pinball games use a larger, captive ball.

The player loads one or more balls into the machine, then presses and releases a spring-loaded handle, which is attached to a padded hammer inside the machine, launching the ball(s) into a metal track. The track guides the ball over the top of the playing field; then when it loses momentum, it falls into the playing field.

The playing field is populated by numerous brass pins, several small cups into which the player hopes the ball will fall (each catcher is barely the width of the ball), and a hole at the bottom into which the ball falls if it does not enter a catcher. The ball bounces from pin to pin, both slowing its descent and deflecting it laterally across the field. A ball that enters a catcher triggers a payout, in which a number of balls are dropped into a tray at the front of the machine.‍

Many games made since the 1960s feature "tulip" catchers, which have small flippers that open to expand the width of the catcher. They are controlled by the machine, and may open and close randomly or in a pattern; expert players try to launch a ball so it reaches the catcher when its flippers are open.‍

The game's object is to win as many balls as possible, which can be exchanged for prizes. Pachinko machines were originally strictly mechanical, but have since incorporated extensive electronics, becoming similar to video slot machines. Another type of machine often found in pachinko parlors, called a "pachislot", does not involve steel balls, but are loaded with tokens or coins and trigger reels comparable to those of a traditional slot machine. Online casinos also offer "pachislot" games to tailor their product to the Japanese market.

== History ==
Pachinko machines were first built during the 1920s as a children's toy called the "Corinth game" (コリントゲーム, korinto gēmu), based on and named after the American "Corinthian bagatelle".‍ It emerged as an adult pastime in Nagoya around 1930, and spread from there.‍

All of Japan's pachinko parlors were closed down during World War II but re-emerged in the late 1940s. Pachinko has remained popular since; the first commercial parlor was opened in Nagoya in 1948.‍ Due to Japanese influence during its 50-year occupation, Taiwan has many pachinko establishments.‍ Guam also hosts a pachinko parlor.‍

An estimated 80 percent of pachinko parlors in Japan are owned by ethnic Koreans.‍ In 2001, British company BS Group bought a stake in Tokyo Plaza, which was running almost 20 parlors in Japan, and had also looked into opening parlors in the United Kingdom.‍

Until the 1980s, pachinko machines were mechanical devices,‍ using bells to indicate different states of the machine. Electricity was used only to flash lights and to indicate problems, such as a machine emptied of its balls.‍ Balls were launched using a flipper; their speed was controlled by pulling the flipper down to different levels. Manufacturers in this period included Nishijin and Sankyo; most of these machines available on online auction sites today date to the 1970s.‍ After that time, pachinko machines incorporated more electronic features, thus requiring electricity for operation.

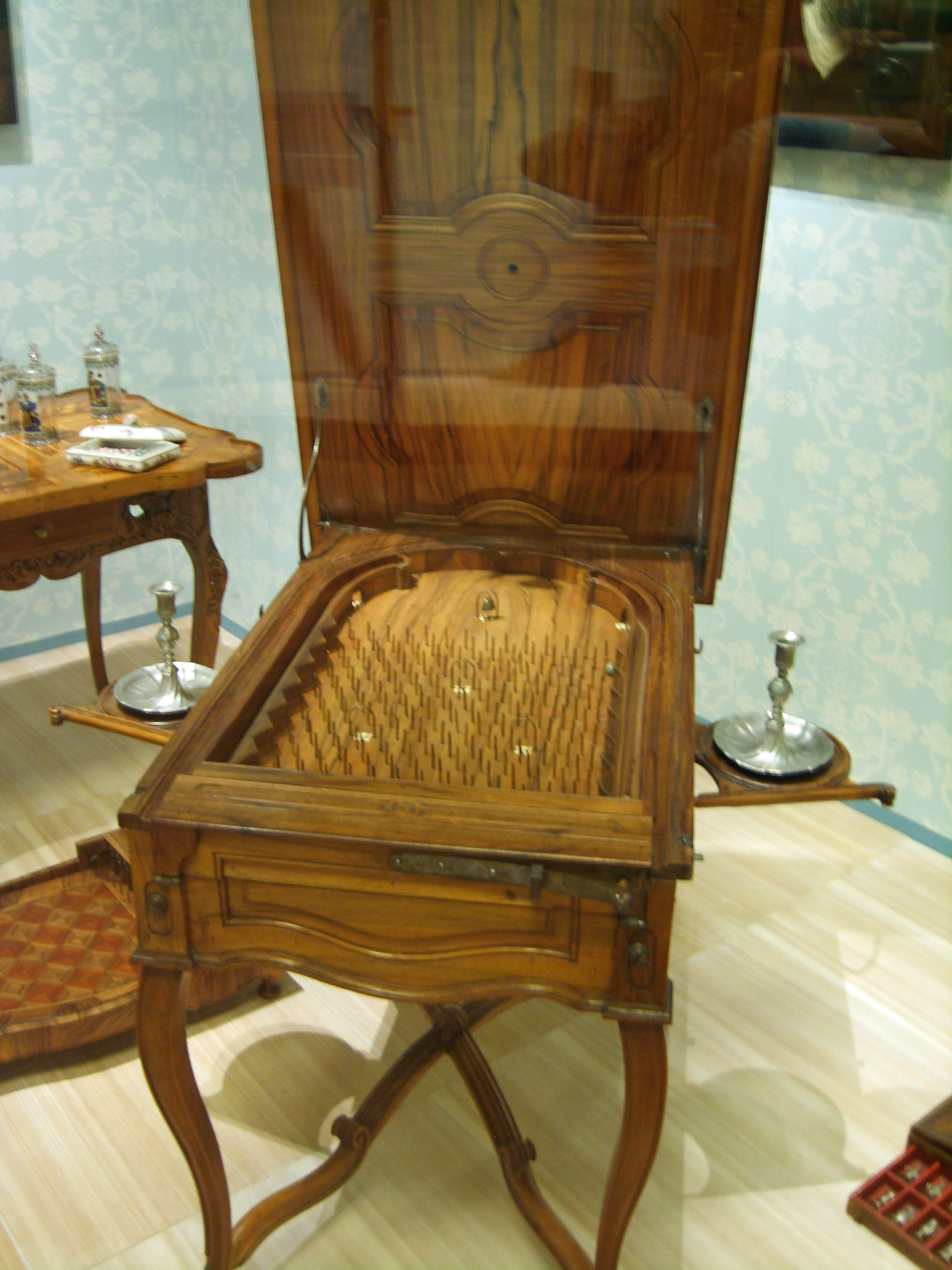
Billard japonais, Southern Germany/Alsace c. 1750–70

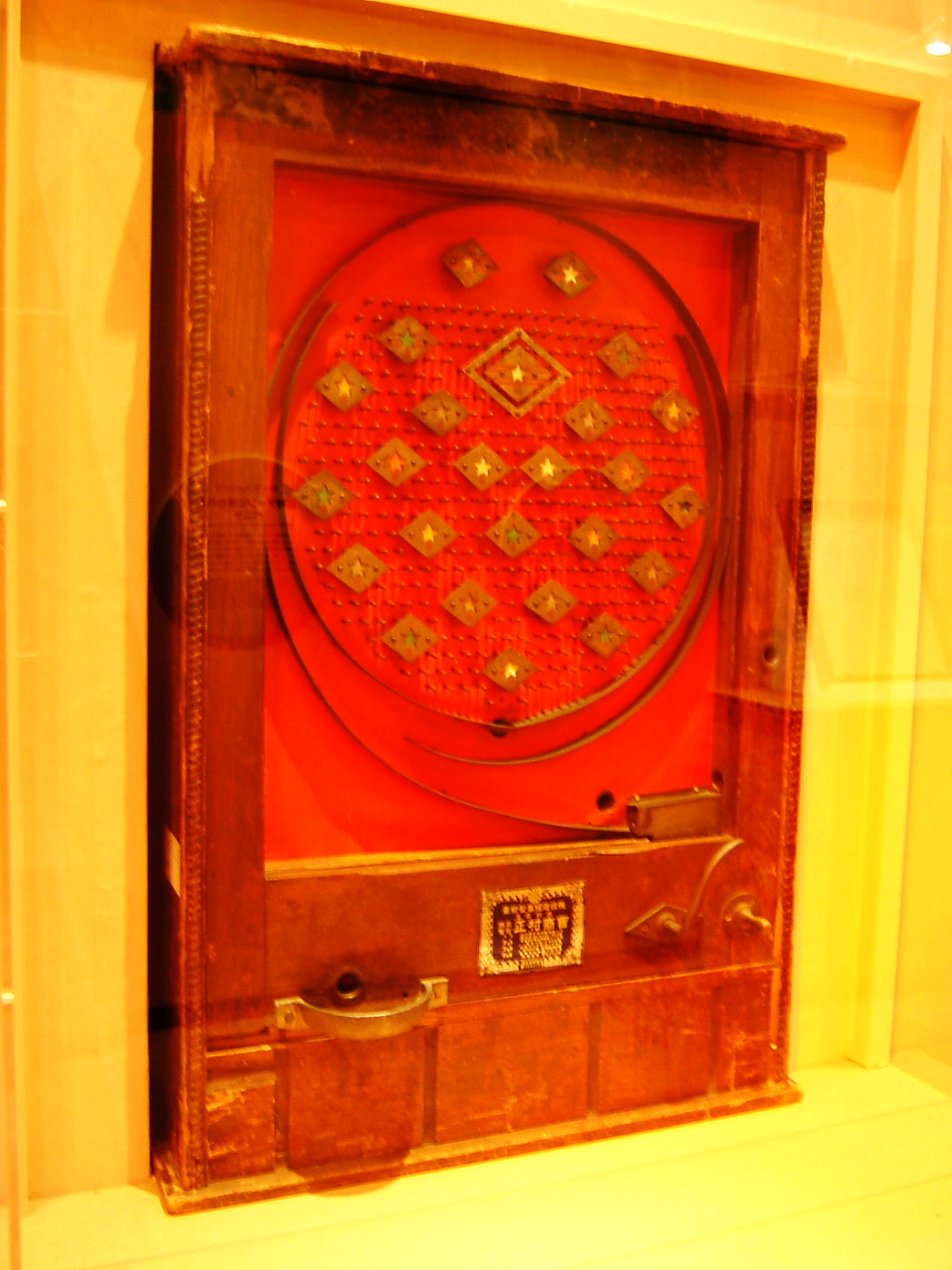
A pre-war pachinko machine

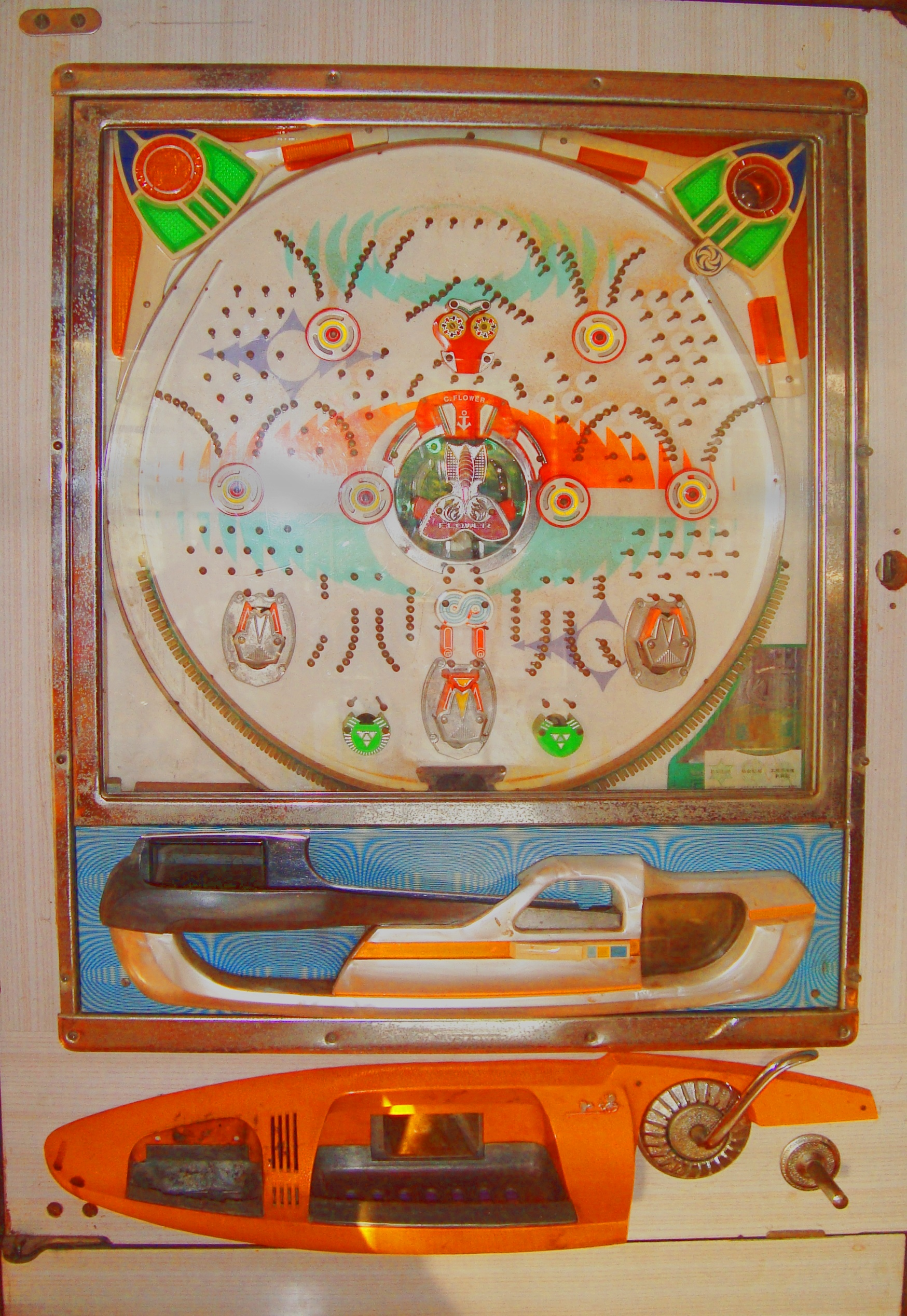
A Sankyo mechanical pachinko machine from the 1970s

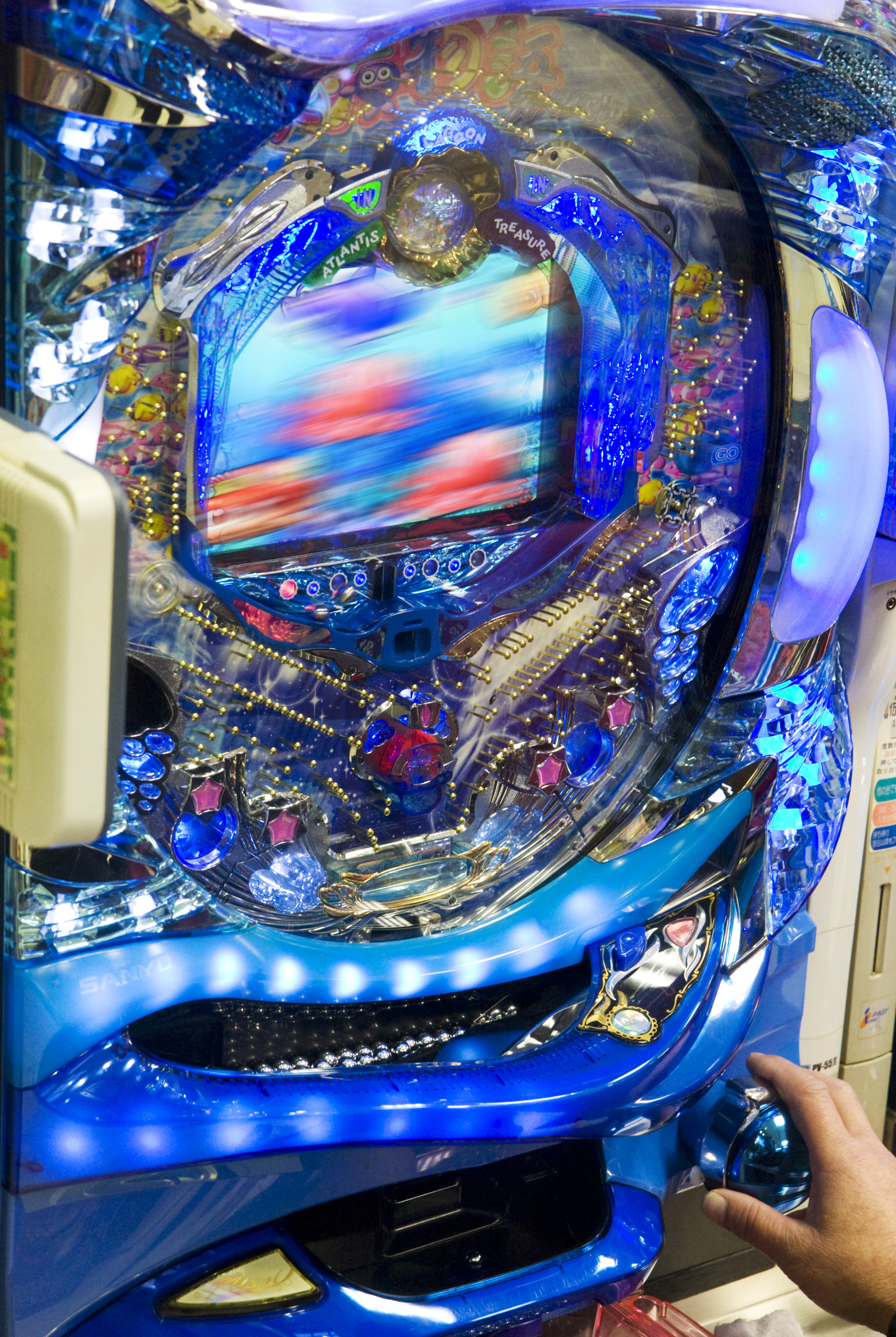
A modern, electronic pachinko machine in a Tokyo parlor

== Mechanisms ==
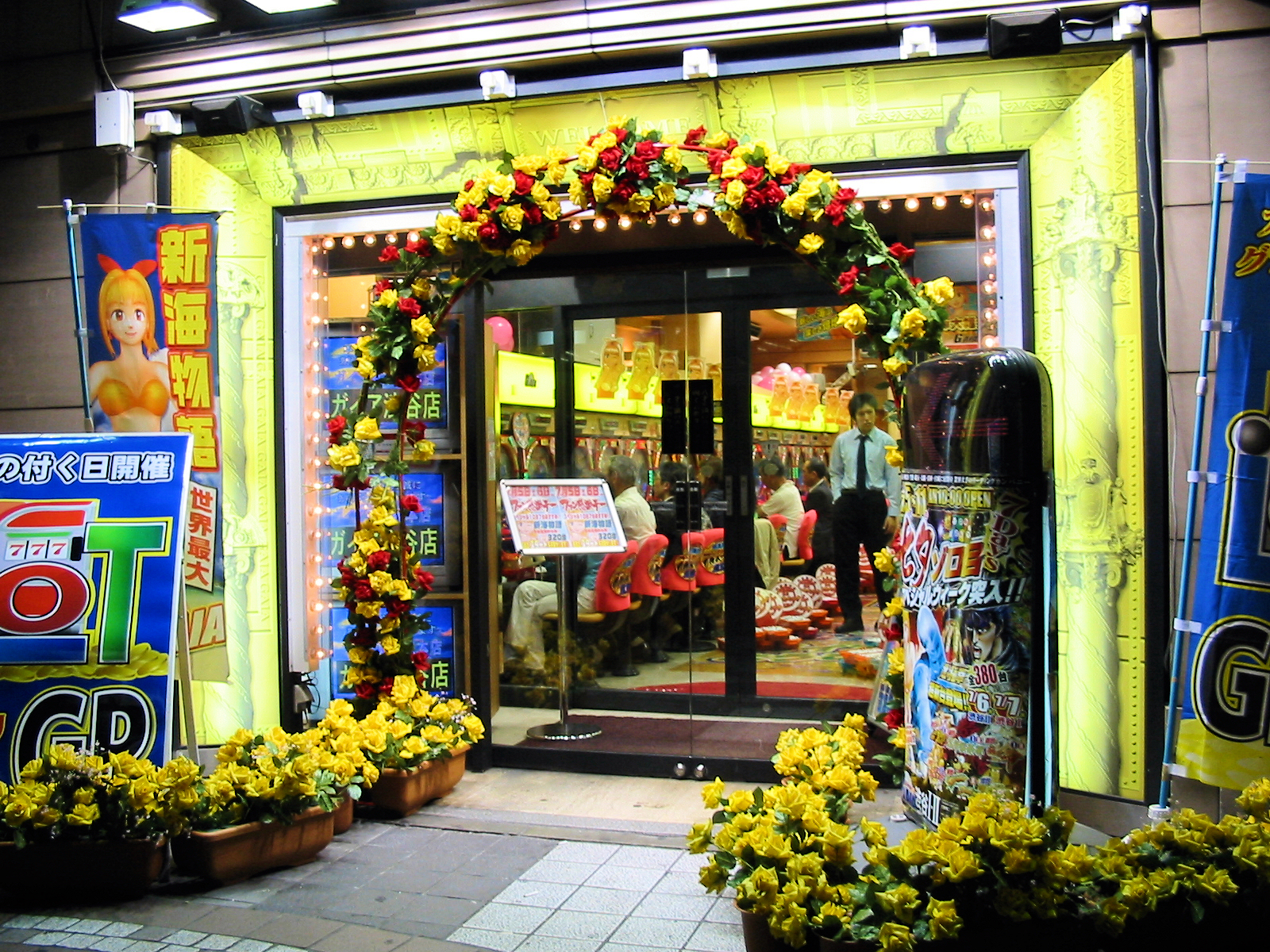
The entrance to a pachinko parlor in Shibuya, Tokyo

To play pachinko, players get a number of metal balls by inserting cash or cards directly into the machine they want to use. They then shoot the balls into the machine. Older pachinko machines use a spring-loaded lever for shooting balls individually; while later ones use a round knob, controlling the strength of a mechanically fired plunger that shoots the balls. The balls fall vertically through an array of pins, levers, cups, traps and obstacles until they enter a payoff target or reach the bottom of the playfield.

The player has a chance to get more balls if a launched ball lands in one of certain places as it falls. More balls allow the player to remain in the game longer, creating a larger chance to win.‍

Newer "pachislot" machines have a digital slot machine display on a large screen, where the objective is to get three numbers or symbols in a row for a jackpot.‍

Every ball that goes into the center gate results in one spin, but there is a limit on the number of spins at one time because of the possibility of balls passing through the center gate while a spin is still in progress. Each spin pays out a small number of balls, but the objective is to hit the jackpot.

=== Design ===
Pachinko machines vary in several aspects—including decorative mechanics, sound, gimmicks, modes, and gates. The playing field is usually a wooden board with a transparent acrylic overlay containing artwork. Most modern machines have an LCD screen over the main start pocket. The game is played by keeping the stream of balls to the left of the screen, but many models have their optimized ball stream. Vintage machines vary in pocket location and strategy, with most having a specific center area containing win pockets.

=== Payout mode ===
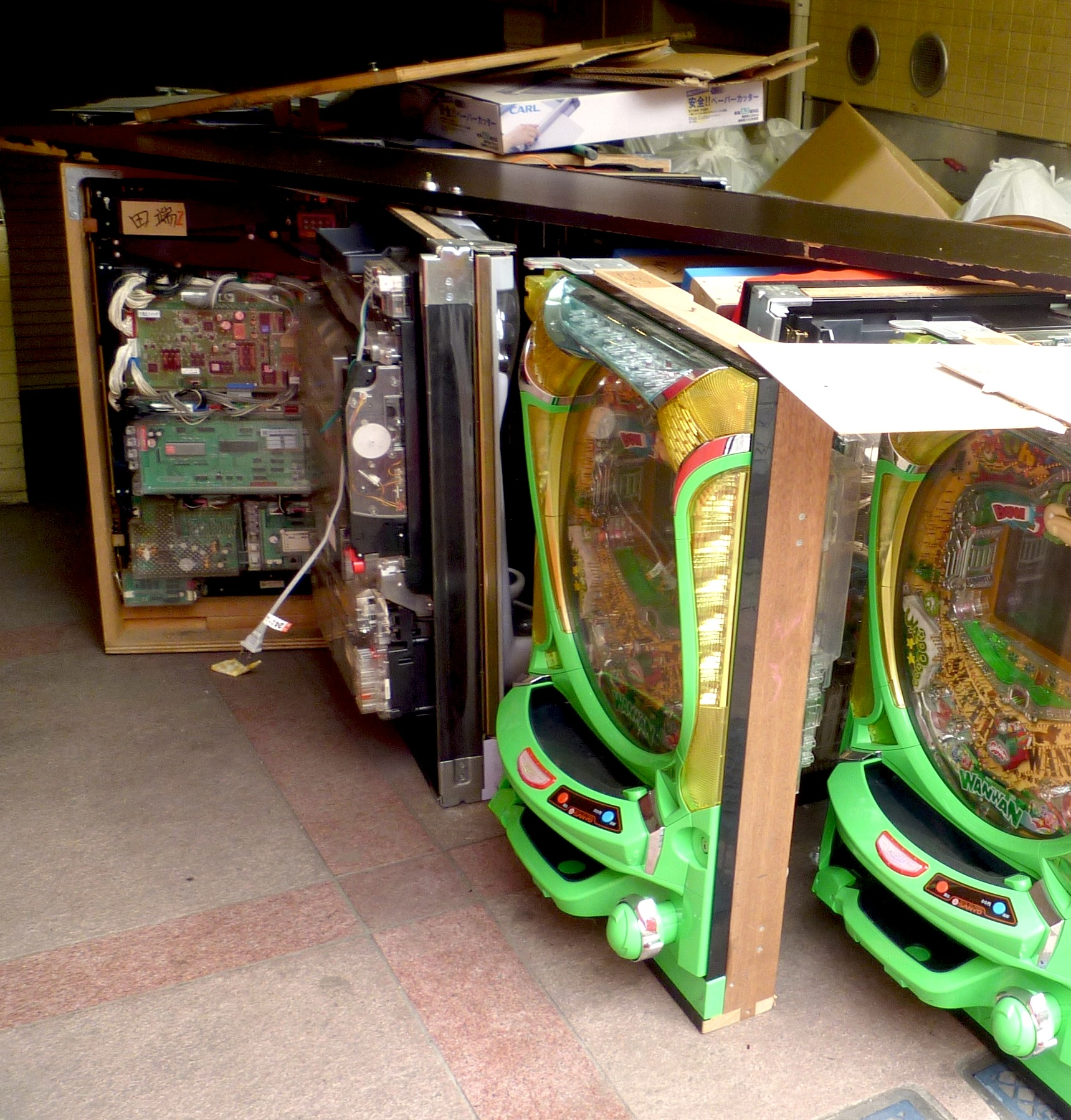
The inside workings of a pachinko machine being pulled out of a parlor

If the first two numbers, letters, or symbols of the spin match up, the digital program will display many animations before the third reel stops spinning, to give the player an added excitement. This is called a "reach" (or rīchi) and sometimes longer animations are played, called "super reaches". Pachinko machines offer different odds in hitting a jackpot; if the player manages to obtain a jackpot, the machine will enter into "payout mode".

The payout mode lasts for a number of rounds. During each round, amidst more animations and movies playing on the center screen, a large payout gate opens up at the bottom of the machine layout and the player must try to shoot balls into it. Each ball that successfully enters into this gate results in many balls being dropped into a separate tray at the bottom of the machine, which can then be placed into a ball bucket.

=== Hidden modes, hints, and instant wins ===
To enhance gameplay, modern machines have integrated several aspects not possible in vintage machines. A common one is the ability to switch between different play modes, including rare and hidden modes that can differ significantly from normal play. Two examples can be seen in the Neon Genesis Evangelion series of pachinko machines, which include "Mission Mode" and "Berserker Mode", ranging from having little effect on winning to being an almost-guaranteed win.‍‍

Graphics in videos and light patterns can also give players a general idea of what these winning odds are. For example, a "super reach" may cause a change in animation, or show an introductory animation or picture. This adds excitement, with some changes having much more significance than others in terms of odds of winning on a given spin. Some machines feature instant wins. There are also second-chance wins, where a spin that appears to have lost, or to have a very low winning chance, gives the player three matching numbers and starts "fever mode".‍

=== Post-payout systems ===
After the payout mode has ended, the pachinko machine may do one of two things. Most pachinko machines employ the kakuhen (確変) system (short for kakuritsu hendō (確率変動; 'probability change')), where some percentage of the possible jackpots on the digital slot machine result in the odds of hitting the next jackpot multiplying by a large amount, followed by another spin regardless of the outcome. The probability of a kakuhen occurring is determined by a random number generator.

Hence, under this system, it is possible for a player to get a string of consecutive jackpots after the first "hard-earned" one, commonly referred to as "fever mode". Another type of kakuhen system is a "special time" or "ST" kakuhen. With these machines, every jackpot earned results in a kakuhen, but in order to earn a payout beyond the first jackpot, the player must hit a certain set of odds within a given number of spins.

When a jackpot does not result in a kakuhen combination, the pachinko machine will enter into jitan (時短) (short for jikan tanshuku (時間短縮; 'time-reduction')) mode, with a much larger number of spins than kakuhen. Under the original payout odds, the center gate widens to make it considerably easier for balls to fall into it; this system is also present in kakuhen.

To compensate for the increase in the number of spins, the digital slot machine reveals the outcome of each spin sooner. ST pachinko machines do not offer this mode; after it ends, the machine spins as in kakuhen. Once no more jackpots have been made, the pachinko machine reverts to its original setting.

=== Koatari ===
Starting in 2007, the majority of Japanese pachinko machines started to include koatari (小当たり; 'small jackpot') into their payout systems. Koatari is shorter than the normal jackpot and during payout mode the payout gate opens for a short time only, even if no balls go into it. The timing of the opening of the gates is unpredictable, effectively making it a jackpot where the player receives no payout. Koatari jackpots can result in a kakuhen as per normal operation, depending on the payout scheme of the machine in question. The main purpose of koatari is so that pachinko manufacturers can offer payout schemes that appear to be largely favorable to customers, without losing any long-term profit.

In addition to being able to offer higher kakuhen percentages, this made it possible for manufacturers to design "battle-type" machines. Unlike old-fashioned pachinko machines that offer a full payout or a kakuhen for any type of jackpot earned, these machines require players to hit a kakuhen jackpot with a certain probability in order to get a full payout. This is orchestrated by the player entering into "battle", where the player, in accordance with the item that the machine is based on, must "defeat" a certain enemy or foe in order to earn another kakuhen. If the player loses, it means that a normal koatari has been hit and the machine enters into jitan mode.

Another reason for incorporating every koatari is that they have made it possible for a machine to go into kakuhen mode without the player's knowledge. This is referred to as senpuku (潜伏; 'hidden') kakuhen because it does not occur in any of the jackpot modes. A player sitting at a used pachinko machine offering the 1 in x chance of hitting a jackpot in normal mode can hit it within x spins easily because the previous player did not realize that the machine was in senpuku. This induces players to keep playing their machines, even though they may still be in normal mode. Japanese pachinko players have not shown significant signs of protest in response to the incorporation of koatari; on the contrary, battle-type pachinko machines have become a major part of most parlors.

== Prizes ==
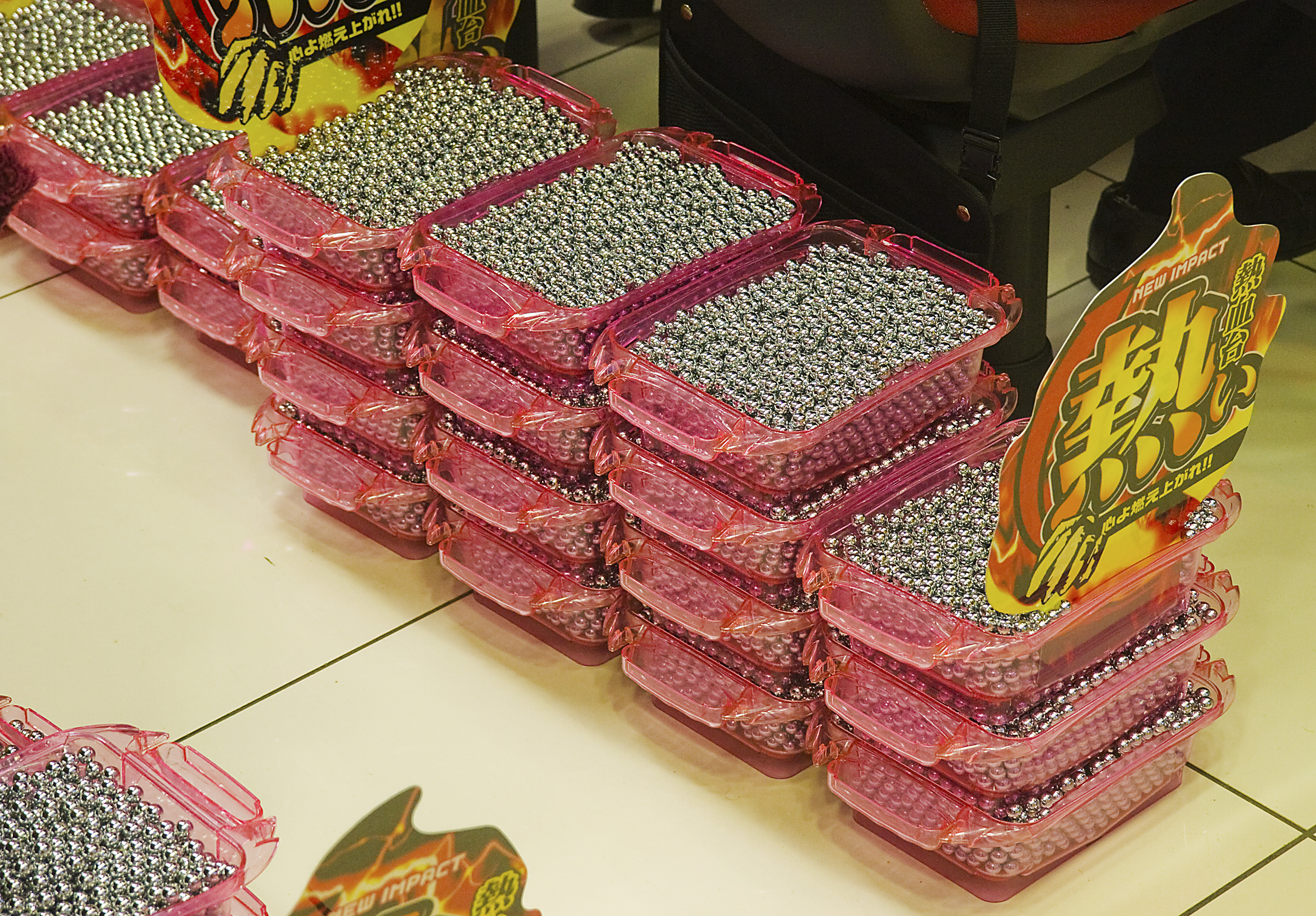
Pachinko balls

Winnings take the form of additional balls, which players may either use to keep playing or exchange for prizes (keihin (景品)). When players wish to exchange their winnings, they must call a parlor staff member by using a call button located at the top of their station. The staff member will then carry the player's balls to an automated counter to see how many balls they have.‍

After recording the number of balls the player won and the number of the machine they used, the staff member will then give the player a voucher or card with the number of balls stored in it. Some modern machines can count the balls automatically, without the need for staff. The player then hands it in at the parlor's exchange center to get their prizes. Among the array of prizes available, there will invariably be an item known as the "special prize" (tokushu keihin (特殊景品), typically a small silver or gold novelty item (encased in plastic) that can be sold for cash at an outside establishment in the vicinity of the parlor.‍

Special prizes are awarded to the player in amounts corresponding to the number of balls won. For example, one special prize worth ¥1500 outside the parlor might be offered to a customer per 400 balls won, assuming each ball originally cost 4 yen. The vast majority of players opt for the maximum number of special prizes offered for their ball total, selecting other prizes only when they have a remaining total too small to receive a special prize.‍

Besides the special prizes, prizes may be as simple as chocolate bars, pens or cigarette lighters, or as complicated as electronics, bicycles and other items. Under Japanese law, cash cannot be paid out directly for pachinko balls, but there is usually a small establishment located nearby, separate from the game parlor but sometimes in a separate unit as part of the same building, where players may sell special prizes for cash. This is tolerated by the police because the pachinko parlors that pay out goods and special prizes are nominally independent from the shops that buy back the special prizes.‍

Some pachinko parlors may even give out vouchers for groceries at a nearby supermarket. The yakuza (organized crime) were formerly often involved in prize exchange, but a great deal of police effort beginning in the 1960s and ramping up in the 1990s has largely done away with their influence.‍ In Tokyo, the special prize exchange is handled exclusively by the Tokyo Union Circulation company (known as TUC), which sells pachinko and slot parlors gold slivers in standardized plastic cases, which it buys back from winning customers at its "TUC Shop" windows.‍

The "three-shop system"‍ is a system employed by pachinko parlors to exchange for keihin (prizes), usually with items such as cigarette lighters or ball-point pens. These items are carried to a nearby shop and exchanged for cash as a way of circumventing gambling laws.

== Recreational pachinko ==
Many arcades in Japan feature pachinko models from different times. They offer more playing time for the same amount of money, and have balls that can be exchanged only for game tokens to play other games in the establishment. As many of these arcades are smoke-free and gambling is removed, they are popular venues for casual players, newcomers, children, and those wanting to play in a more relaxed atmosphere.

In such arcades, thrifty gamblers may spend a small amount on a newly released pachinko model to get a feel for the machine before going to a real parlor. These machines can also be found in many stores, where they pay out capsules containing a prize coupon or store credit.

== Regulations ==
=== Smoking ===
Smoking is allowed in pachinko parlors, although there are discussions in Japan to extend public smoking bans to them.‍

=== Crime ===
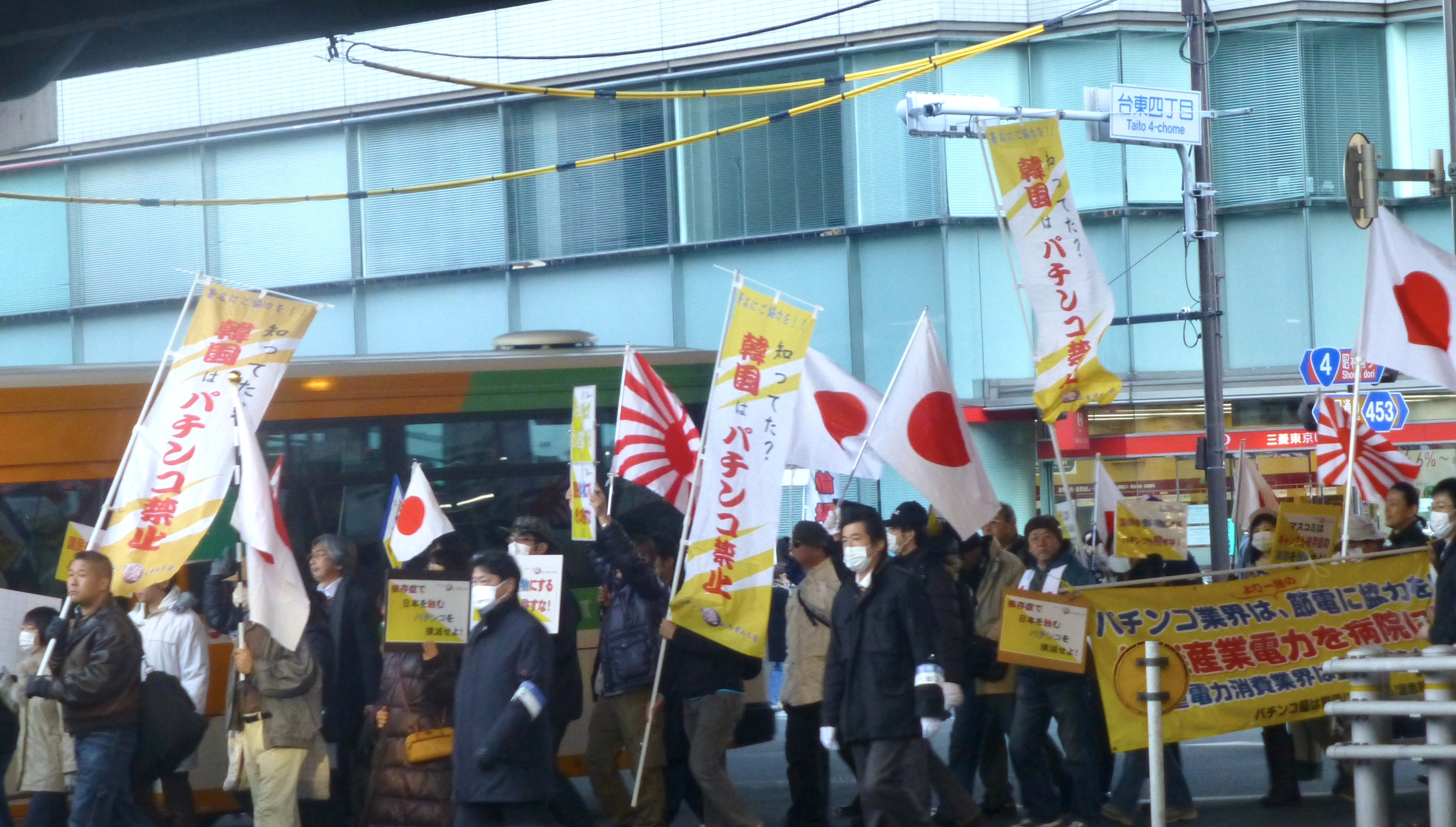
An anti-pachinko demonstration in Tokyo, Japan in 2013

Gambling is illegal in Japan, but pachinko is regarded as an exception and treated as an amusement activity.‍ Although awarding direct money prizes for it is illegal, parlors may reward players with tokens which can then be sold for cash at nearby exchange centers. With growing public and political pressure in recent years, since passage of Japan's blanket anti-gambling law in the 1990s, police are more active in regulating parlors.‍

Retired police officers often work in the pachinko industry; critics have pointed out that while this has had a deterrent effect against organized crime, it also means these operators are in a strong position to influence police officers in their favor.‍

Police tolerate the level of gambling in pachinko parlors. For example, in May 2005, a parlor in Kanagawa Prefecture reported to the local police that someone had counterfeited their tokens and made off with the equivalent of US$60,000 in cash by trading them in at their nearby exchange center. Even with such information proving that this parlor was illegally operating an exchange center, which by law must be independent of the parlor, the police did not shut them down, but tracked down the thief.‍

=== Ball designs ===
It is forbidden for pachinko balls to be removed from a parlor to be used elsewhere. To help prevent this, many parlors have a design or name engraved on each of their balls, inspiring some people to collect pachinko balls with various designs.

== Addiction ==
A 2014 study showed that pathological gambling among Japanese adults was 9.04% in men and 1.6% in women, higher than the North American prevalence of 1.6%, particularly for men.‍ In 1999, 29% of players thought of themselves as addicted and needing treatment. Another 30% said they exceeded their budgets and borrowed money to play.‍

== Franchising ==
A number of media franchises, mainly the media mix—including Japanese film, anime, manga, television and video game franchises—have generated significant revenue from sales of licensed pachinko and pachislot machines to pachinko parlors and amusement arcades.‍ Sega Sammy Holdings and Konami are two major license holders for most media mix pachinko machines.‍

Some original pachinko games were adapted into anime: examples include Bakumatsu Gijinden Roman, Battle Girls: Time Paradox!, Rio: Rainbow Gate!, and Yoshimune.

== See also ==
- Galton board – Device invented by Francis Galton (a.k.a. bean machine or quincunx)
- Payazzo – Finnish gambling arcade game
- Pachinko allocation – Statistical tool
- Plinko, a game similar to pachinko, featured on the American game show The Price Is Right
- Visual Pinball, a software game engine for creating computer game simulations of pachinko and pinball machines
- The Wall, an American game show, features a four-story-high pegboard wall similar to Plinko and Pachinko
