= Pacific Science Center =

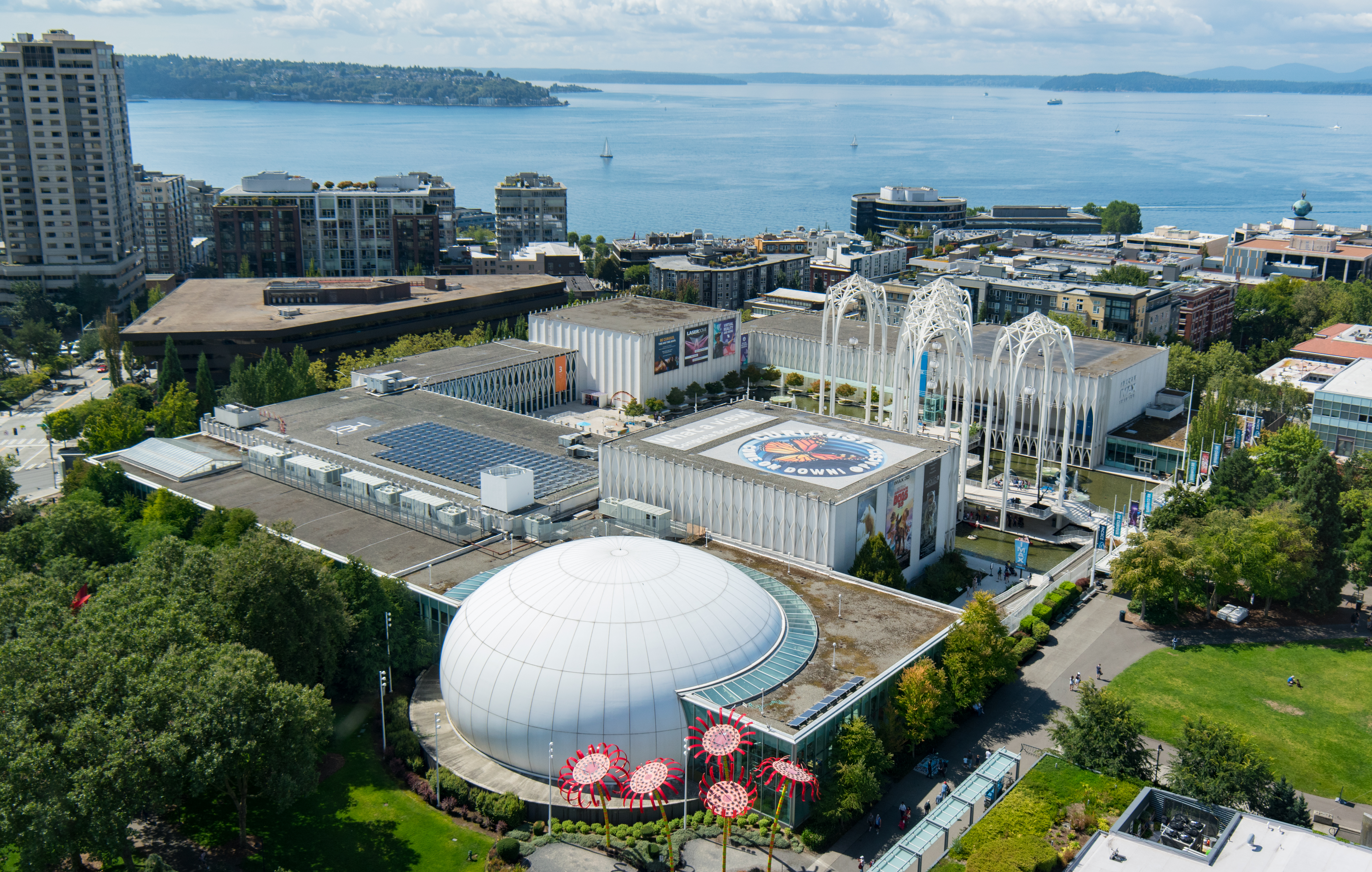
- Former name: United States Science Pavilion (part of World's Fair in Seattle)
- Established: 1962; 64 years ago
- Location: Seattle, Washington, U.S.
- Coordinates: 47.6192°N 122.3511°W
- Type: Science center
- Directors: Kevin Malgesini (President and CEO)
- Architect: Minoru Yamasaki
- Website: pacificsciencecenter.org

Pacific Science Center (PacSci) is a nonprofit science education organization in Seattle, Washington, United States. Its main science museum is on the ground of the Seattle Center near Downtown Seattle with auxiliary facilities in Bellevue, Washington. Pacific Science Center was founded in 1962 and reused the United States Science Pavilion that was built for the Century 21 Exposition. The Seattle campus has more than 1 million visitors each year.

== Organization ==
Pacific Science Center is a nonprofit organization that operates its namesake museum on 7.1 acres (29,000 m^{2}) of land at the southwest corner of Seattle Center, a city-owned civic campus. Part of the museum was sold to Center Art LLC, associated with the owners of the nearby Space Needle, in 2026. A satellite campus, the Mercer Slough Environmental Education Center, is a collaboration between Pacific Science Center and the City of Bellevue, Washington with educational programming for all ages about environmental stewardship, wetland ecology and nature awareness. Pacific Science Center also offers year-round youth, teen, family and adult programs, including summer camps in various Puget Sound locations, science-themed 21+ events and research weekends.

Pacific Science Center's outreach program, Science On Wheels, has a fleet of vans that bring hands-on science education to schools throughout the Pacific Northwest. The center also has a division of staff whose purpose is to assist teachers in teaching science to their students.

== History ==
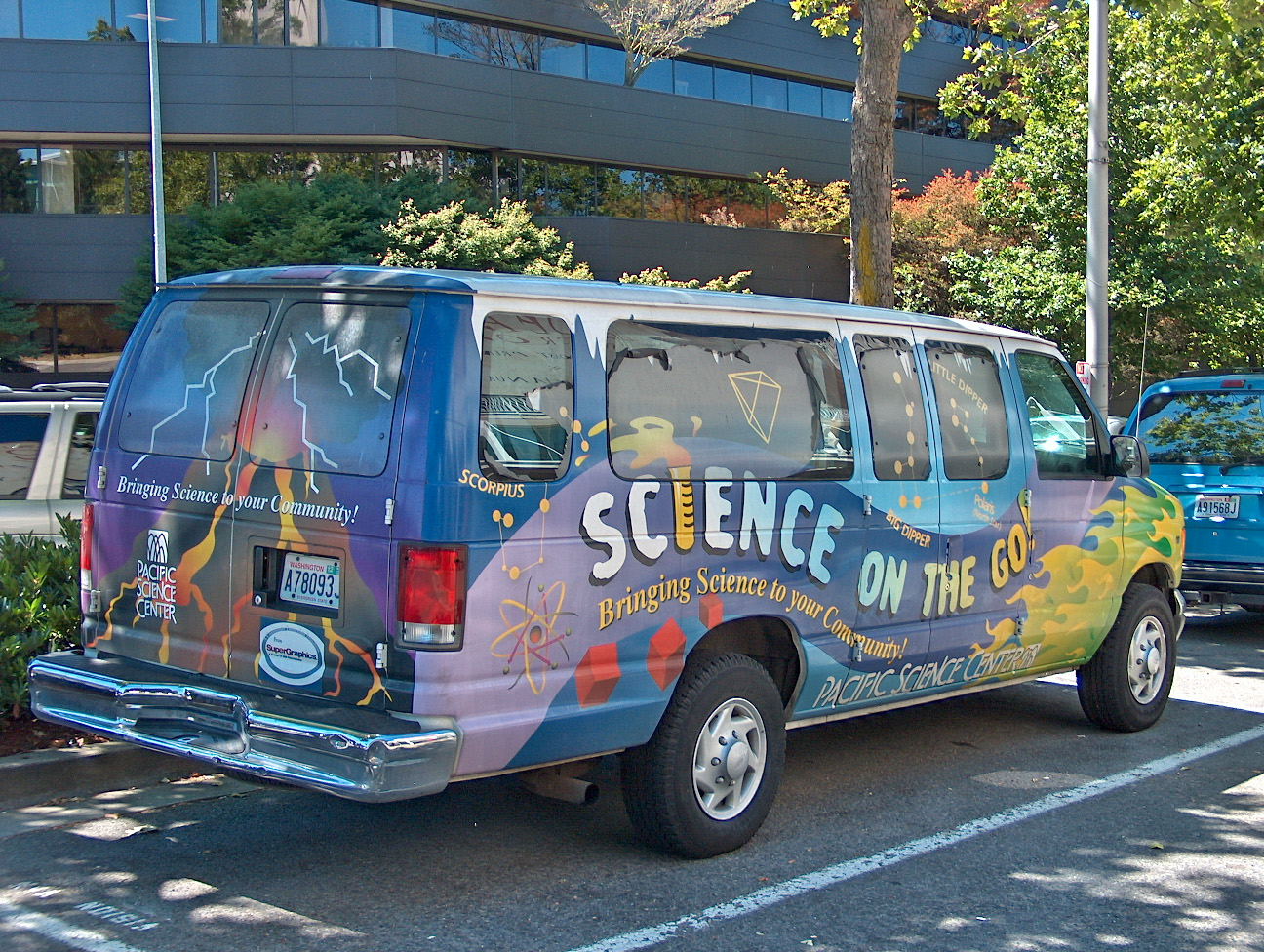
A Science Center van

The center's original buildings were the United States Science Pavilion designed by Minoru Yamasaki for the 1962 World's Fair in Seattle. The World of Science, along with the Worlds of Art, Entertainment, Commerce and Industry, and Tomorrow were the five main theme areas that were installed the World's Fair. Located at the southernmost end of the fairgrounds and west of the Space Needle, the World of Science was located next to the arches, an easily-identifiable landmark.

The fountains located at the entrance of the center appeared in the movie It Happened at the World's Fair with Elvis Presley. After the World's Fair closed, the US Science Pavilion was re-opened as Pacific Science Center. The land and buildings were leased for $1.00 a year until 2004, when the title deed was signed over and the Pacific Science Center Foundation officially took ownership.

=== 1960s ===
During the 1960s, many of the center's exhibits were carried over from the original World's Fair exhibition; only a few of these original exhibits remain today. Currently, exhibits remaining from the World's Fair are the Lens and Mirror Machine and a suspended model of the Earth's moon. One of the more notable science exhibits during the World's Fair was a ramp where the buildings were built at a tilt (the "illusion ramp"); this exhibit was reproduced in the late 1990s. The domed Spacerium, now known as the Seattle Laser Dome and used for laser light show, was designed for a wide-angle movie journey through space. Before IMAX, a previous movie theater there showed films such as NASA's Apollo 8 (to the soundtrack of Yellow Submarine) and The 21st Century with Walter Cronkite. Before being elected governor of the state of Washington, Dixy Lee Ray served as Science Center director for many years. Ray helped promote the Science Center among school children by hosting a school-age geared science program televised on Seattle PBS station KCTS-9.

=== 1970s ===
In the mid-1970s, the lower-level math area was dominated by the Mathematica: A World of Numbers... and Beyond exhibit, where demonstrators in orange jackets (known as "OJ"s) made soap bubbles and showed audiences how the stylish new Chevrolet Chevette was paving the way for the quick adoption of the metric system. Upstairs, a giant apparatus known as the "probability machine" would ring an alarm before emptying out a bin of balls. The entire exhibition had been originally designed as an exhibit for the IBM Pavilion at the 1964–65 New York World's Fair. It was permanently removed around 1980.

An aerospace building contained a full-sized lunar module mockup from which suited astronauts would climb out. The Life Building contained the Sea Monster House, a replica of a First Nations longhouse, as well as a working hydraulic model of Puget Sound and the Mount Baker volcanic exhibit.

With the physical sciences, the physics witch on Halloween would ask "Would you like to boil blood in a paper cup?" or Groucho Marx would dump liquid nitrogen on the ponds after a demo. The presenters in question here were Janie Mann, who did dynamic combustion shows dressed as a witch circa 1977–78, and Dan Cox, who did physics demos as Groucho Marx in the same era. Cox would later go on to become a professor of physics. These staff were part of the "OJ" program (short for "Orange Jacket", the uniform of the time for Science Center tour guides and visitor assistants). The program consisted of 24 work study students, whose leader in the late 1970s and early 1980s, Carl Linde, set a format for the program that would last into the late 1990s. The Eames theater was originally created for a special multi-screen IBM movie for the World Fair. It was later converted into an IMAX screen in 1979, the first of two IMAX theaters at the center.

=== 1980s ===
Pacific Science Center grew dramatically in the 1980s. A key step in its evolution was the hiring of George Moynihan as executive director in 1980. Moynihan, from the Lawrence Hall of Science in Berkeley, California, would run the center for the next two decades. His leadership team in the 1980s included Diane Carlson in public programs, Dennis Schatz in education and exhibits, and Dave Taylor in exhibits. In 1984 the science center took a gamble on hosting the exhibit China: 7000 Years of Discovery. The success of the exhibit helped put PSC on the map as a leading science center. Other notable successes later in the decade were several iterations of a traveling robotic dinosaur exhibit, which led to the center eventually installing a permanent dinosaur display in the 1990s. Pacific Science Center hosted the annual Association of Science and Technology Centers conference in October 1987 and opened several major exhibits in the same period, including Kids Works, Body Works, an animal area, and a tide pool.

== Design and architecture ==
The Pacific Science Center complex was designed by Minoru Yamasaki; the design brought him international fame, and was featured on the front cover of Time magazine. He later became architect of the World Trade Center in New York City. The walls of each building, composed of many pre-cast concrete slabs, form an arch motif which was used by Yamasaki in a number of his other designs. In 2025, plans were announced to renovate the courtyard and integrate it into the rest of the Seattle Center grounds with improvements to public access.

In 2013 Pacific Science Center put out a call for public art which would demonstrate the use of solar energy. The resulting installation was designed by Seattle artist Dan Corson and involves five 10 meter (33 ft) tall sculptures of flowers, inspired by the Australian firewheel tree. The work is titled Sonic Bloom and generates electricity using solar panels mounted in the flower heads. The flowers hum when people approach them and light up at night.

== IMAX and permanent exhibits ==
Today, the Pacific Science Center is composed of eight buildings, including two IMAX theaters (one of only a few places in the world with more than one IMAX theater), one of the world's largest Laser Dome theaters, a dinosaur exhibit (installed in 1990 --when first installed, it was in Building 3 until the end of 1999, then in the beginning of 2000 it moved to Building 1), a tropical butterfly house, a planetarium, and hundreds of hands-on science exhibits. In addition to a number of permanent exhibits the center also hosts a variety of traveling and temporary exhibits.

== See also ==
- List of science centers
- List of most-visited museums in the United States
