= Nepenthes (sculpture) =

Sculpture series by Dan Corson in Portland, Oregon

- One of the sculptures in 2015
- Artist: Dan Corson
- Year: 2013
- Type: Sculpture
- Subject: Nepenthes
- Dimensions: 5.2 m (17 ft)
- Location: Portland, Oregon, United States; 45°31′28″N 122°40′38″W
- Website: dancorson.com/nepenthes

Nepenthes is a series of four sculptures by artist Dan Corson, installed in 2013 along Northwest Davis Street in the Old Town Chinatown neighborhood of Portland, Oregon, in the United States. The work was inspired by the genus of carnivorous plants of the same name, known as tropical pitcher plants. The sculptures are 17 feet (5.2 m) tall and glow in the dark due to photovoltaics.

== Description and history ==
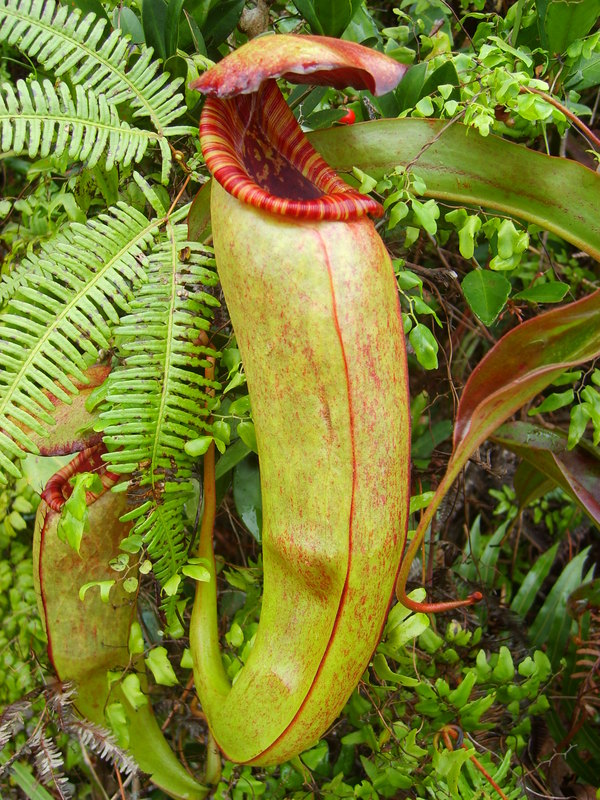
The sculptures were inspired by the genus of carnivorous plants of the same name (Nepenthes bokorensis pictured).

Nepenthes is a series of four sculptures by Dan Corson. Located along Northwest Davis Street between Fifth and Eighth Avenues, the pieces are inspired by the genus of carnivorous plants of the same name, commonly referred to as tropical pitcher plants. According to Corson and the Regional Arts & Culture Council (RACC), which maintains the sculpture series, the work and genus are named after the "magical Greek potion that eliminates sorrow and suffering". The agency said that Nepenthes "insert[s] a quirky expression of nature into an urban environment" and celebrates the "unique and diverse community" of Portland's Old Town Chinatown neighborhood. Each bulbous-shaped sculpture is nearly 17 feet (5.2 m) tall and glows in the dark due to photovoltaics.

The work was commissioned by TriMet's Portland Mall Project in an attempt to increase "pedestrian connectivity" between Old Town Chinatown and the Pearl District. Corson was hired by the Portland Mall Project's design team, which was led by ZGF Architects LLP. The Old Town/Chinatown Visions Committee was also involved in the early stages of the project. Once the project evolved from a lighting project into a sculpture, TriMet asked RACC to facilitate the project on behalf of the city's public art collection. The project had a $300,000 budget and required several design changes. RACC assembled a panel of "original stakeholders", artists and neighbors, to refine Corson's design. The agency worked with Portland Transportation to determine the exact placement of the pieces. Some of them were reportedly placed in "awkward" locations in order to receive direct light so the solar panels could function properly, or to accommodate infrastructure beneath the sidewalk. The sculptures were installed in May 2013.

A version of the statues has been installed in the newly developed community of Paisley, Edmonton using the molds developed for the City of Portland. The Edmonton rendering is called Nepenthes Paisleyi and contains sensors that pick up on people's movements to trigger light animations after nightfall.

== Reception ==
Nepenthes received a mixed reception. RACC has reportedly received mixed reviews from "folks who felt that [the sculptures] sort of appeared out of nowhere and were a little random in their placement." One spokesperson for the agency said people directly involved with the project were happy with the final product. Willamette Week's Richard Spear called the work an "atrocity", "garish and cheap-looking." He wrote that the pieces were more appropriate for an outlet mall in Kissimmee, Florida, "come across as dumbed-down knockoffs of Chihuly glass", and "could be used as props in a high-school staging of The Little Mermaid". Following installation, the owner of a gallery located next to one of the sculptures compared them to lava lamps and expressed hope that they would be run over by a truck.

On the other hand, the American media company PSFK called the designs "startling", noting that as street lamps, "they are far from your typical metal and light bulb structures." John Metcalfe of CityLab writes, "Portland residents have had the unexpected pleasure of walking through an alien greenhouse of huge, bizarrely colored carnivorous plants." Art and Architecture refers to them as "amazing structures". The online trend community blog Trend Hunter calls the work "incredibly vibrant" and "visually striking", and says it "gives 'urban jungle' a completely new meaning". The architecture and design weblog Inhabitat calls them "beautiful, quirky and exotically colorful."

The daily web magazine Designboom says of the statues, "each fiberglass sculpture glows from within at night creating an intriguing and dramatic street presence", "curvaceous shadows animate the sidewalk on sunny days", and the sculptures are "touchable: many people are drawn to the form or surfaces and feel compelled to stroke them as they walk by". Kristi in Arts, a Portland public art blog, noting that, "The goal is for the sculptures to create an inviting pathway leading people from the Pearl District into Old Town" comments, "I wish they had installed about 10 more leading further into Northwest," and then adds, "Not only do they look fantastic, but they are powered by solar and run LED lights. Nice work, Portland."

== See also ==
- 2013 in art
- Environmental art
