= Payazzo =

Finnish gambling arcade game

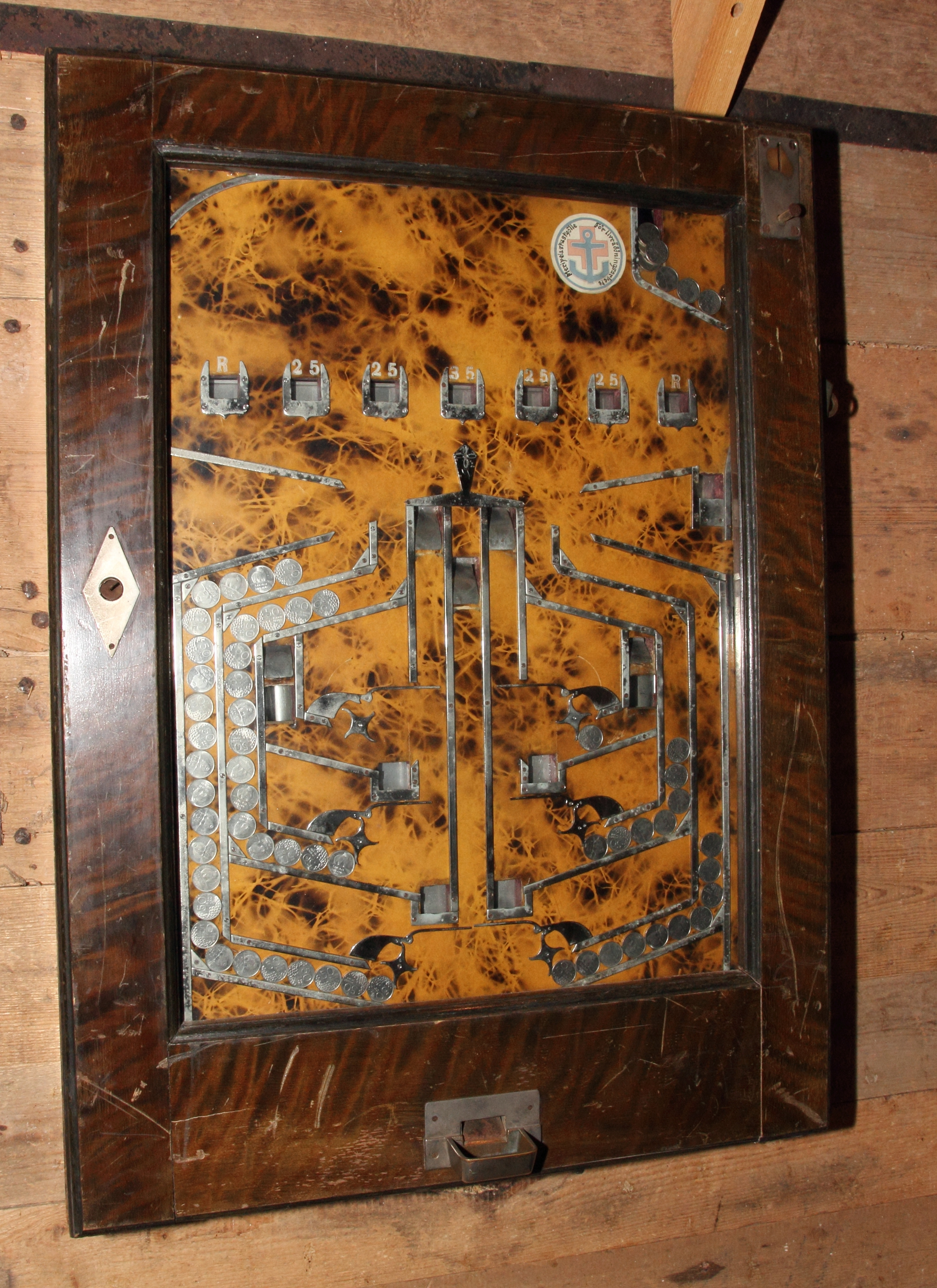
Early payazzo, possibly from 1920s/30s, on display at the Forum Marinum maritime museum

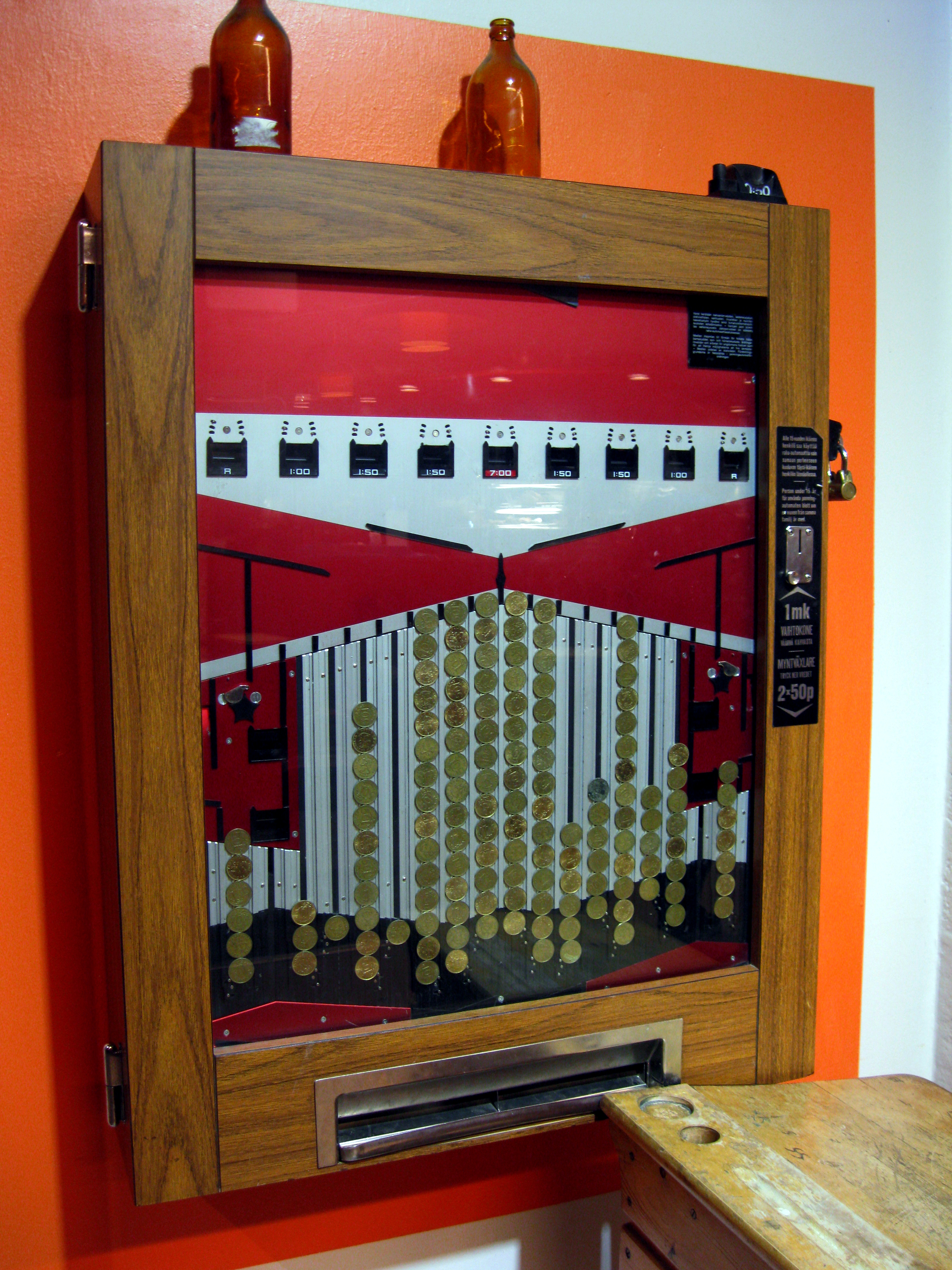
More modern payazzo from the 1980s

Payazzo (or pajatso) is a traditional Finnish gambling arcade game, dating back to the 1920s, when it was introduced into Finland from Germany. The object of payazzo is to flick a coin into one of the winning slots. When the attempt is successful, the machine rewards the player with coins according to the amount indicated in the slot. If the attempt is unsuccessful, the player loses the flicked coin.

== Name ==
The game is called pajatso in Finnish. It is a Fennicized form of bajazzo, the name of the early German models. Bajazzo refers to an Italian-style clown (pagliaccio in Italian). Finland's Slot Machine Association (Finnish: Raha-automaattiyhdistys or RAY), the manufacturer of today's payazzo machines, uses payazzo in English for pajatso.

In Finland, the game is often referred to informally as Jasso. The popularity of the nickname was proven as the manufacturer decided to use only the informal form in the names of some models of payazzo combining coin flicking with an electronic game of luck. These models are Hedelmäjazzo (Fruit Jazzo) from the early nineties and Komeetta Jasso (The Comet-Jasso), which is used today.

== Description of a payazzo machine ==
Physically, a payazzo machine looks like an arcade cabinet, but it is slightly wider than an ordinary video game arcade cabinet. The front panel of the machine is transparent to allow the player see the flight of the coin.

Behind the transparent front panel there is a vertical playing area that is less than a meter wide and approximately twenty centimeters high (for machines with a single row of winning slots). The thickness of the playing area is slightly more than the thickness of the coin. In the playing area, there are the winning slots, typically nine in modern models, in one row (two rows in some models). The row spans horizontally the entire length of the playing area, and it is slightly below the point where the coin enters the playing area.

A metal ring used to hit the coin is on the right side of the machine (rather than on the front panel) at the height of a typical user's chest. In traditional models, the slot for feeding coins into the machine is on the top of the machine.

In traditional models, also the supply of coins available for paying winnings is visible through the transparent front panel. This way the player can estimate whether there is enough money in the machine to pay potential winnings.

== Description of the game ==
The player feeds a coin into the machine and flicks it by hitting a metal ring with a finger. The power of hitting controls the initial speed of the coin; determining the initial speed is the only way the player can control the movement of the coin. The initial flying direction of the coin is constant (to the left and slightly upwards).

The coin enters the playing area from the right side. It bounces off the edges of the playing area and gates, small obstacles next to the entries to the winning slots.

Eventually the coin either drops into one of the winning slots or it falls down between the slots. The positioning of the gates usually makes the latter possibility more likely. In the former case, the player gets a prize of a couple of coins, and in the latter case the player loses the flicked coin. The size of the prize for each winning slot is printed next to the winning slot, varying from two times the value of the flicked coin to ten or even one hundred times the flicked coin. The most valuable winning slots are in the middle of the playing area, and in modern machines the most valuable slot has a variable payoff so that the best payoff may not be even in principle achievable with every flick.

== History ==
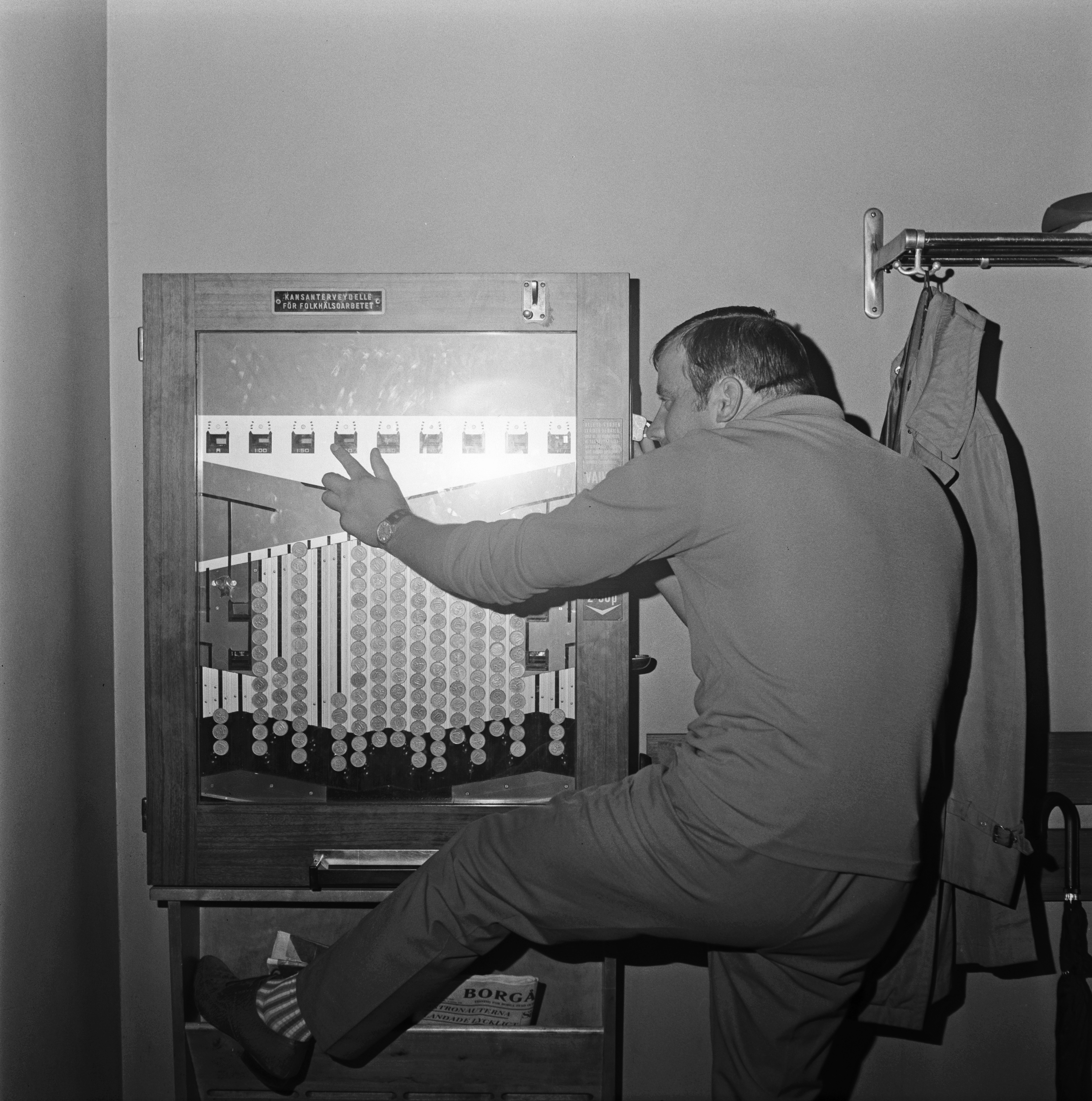
Man plays with Payazzo in Porvoo 1960s

The predecessors of payazzo machines, called bajazzo machines, were manufactured in Germany in the beginning of the 20th century. The game arrived in Finland in the middle of the 1920s, and Finns started calling it pajatso.

The bajazzo machines differed from payazzo machines. In a bajazzo game, a ball was dropped from the top of the machine and the player attempted to catch it into a hat held by a bajazzo figure. The first true payazzo machine was developed in Germany in the late 1920s, and it was called Blau Wunder. In Finland, the name pajatso was used also for this machine.

It became prohibited to operate payazzos in Finland in 1933, except to raise funds for charity. Since 1937, the state-owned operator of gambling machines, Raha-automaattiyhdistys has a monopoly for payazzos. The profits of Raha-automaattiyhdistys are distributed to various charity organizations who promote public health and social welfare.

Raha-automaattiyhdistys has manufactured payazzos since 1938. The basic structure of payazzo remained the same for a long time, except that the denomination of the coin the game was played with varied due to inflation. It is customary to identify the old machines by announcing the denomination of the coin used to play the game, these old machines include 20 penni payazzo (1958), 50 penni payazzo (1967), and one markka payazzo (1976).

With the introduction of the 50 penni payazzo, the gates were introduced. By adjusting the gates, the operator of payazzo can control the difficulty of the game more accurately.

The first electronic payazzo was introduced in 1982; older payazzos were completely mechanical. In electronic payazzos, the actual game is played with a real, physical coin, but the electronics are used to determine if the player feeds money into the machine, to register whether a coin falls into a winning slot and to pay winnings to the player. By using the electronics, it was possible program variable winning sums for each slot.

== Today's models ==
Nowadays, Raha-automaattiyhdistys operates three models of payazzo machines. The first model is Pajatso, which provides a playing experience similar to the traditional mechanical games. The second model is Komeetta Jasso, which combines the payazzo-style coin flicking with an electronic game of luck. In Komeetta Jasso, the player can also change the winning sums the machine pays by flicking a coin into a designated slot. Both of these models are played with the 20 cent coin. The third model is Pajatso RAY, which is played with coin-like metal disks. In addition to the traditional single-flick game, Pajatso Ray has other games consisting of several flicks.

In Finland, payazzos can be found in special gambling arcades, and also in pubs, restaurants and supermarkets.

== Outside Finland ==
During its history, Raha-automaattiyhdistys has exported payazzos into Norway, Soviet Union, Hungary, Australia, Netherlands, Las Vegas, Iceland and Sweden. Nowadays, payazzo can be played, in addition to Finland, in Chile, where a local operator uses Finnish electronic payazzos.

== In popular culture ==
- In the song Iisalmen discossa Juice Leskinen sings that he skipped a slow dance while he played payazzo in a discotheque.
- In the song Raptori the rap group Raptori sings that they bought their leather jackets at a thrift store after winning a jackpot in payazzo.
- From December 2008 to September 2009, the Apple App Store contained the coin game entitled "Pajatzo".

== See also ==
- Pachinko is a similar Japanese game, played with steel balls instead of coins.
