= Sonic Bloom (sculpture) =

2013 sculpture in Seattle, Washington, U.S.

- The sculpture in 2022
- Artist: Dan Corson
- Location: Seattle, Washington, U.S.
- 47.6200°N 122.3503°W

Sonic Bloom is a 2013 solar-powered sculpture by Dan Corson, installed in Seattle's Pacific Science Center, in the U.S. state of Washington. Bellamy Pailthorp wrote, "It looks a bit like something you might find in a book by Dr. Seuss: five huge sculpted sunflowers with striped green and orange stems."
