= Lu Duble =

American artist (1896–1970)

- Lu Duble, from a 1940 newspaper.
- Born: Lucinda Christine Davies; January 21, 1896; Oxford
- Died: August 8, 1970 (aged 74); New York
- Other names: Lucinda Duble, Lu Duble Geiffert
- Awards: Guggenheim Fellowship (1937)

Lu Duble (January 21, 1896 – August 8, 1970), born Lucinda Davies, was an English-born American artist. She was awarded a Guggenheim Fellowship in 1937 and 1938, to study art and sculpture in Haiti.

== Early life and education ==
Lucinda Christine Davies was born in 1896, in Oxford, England, the daughter of John Walter Davies and Marianne Mogridge Davies. Her father was an author, editor, and journalist. Her mother's grandfather was author George Mogridge. She moved to the United States with her parents in 1903, as a young child. Davies trained at the Art Students League and Cooper Union in New York City. Her mentors included Alexander Archipenko, Jose de Creeft, and Hans Hofmann.

== Career ==
From 1918 to 1937, Duble was head of the sculpture program at Bennett Junior College in Millbrook, New York. She also taught sculpture classes at Brearley School, Dalton School, Greenwich House, and Montclair Art Museum. She was awarded a Guggenheim Fellowship in 1937 and 1938, to study art and sculpture in Haiti. Another travel fellowship, from the Institute of International Education, sent her to Mexico from 1942 to 1944, where she made sculptures and studied Mayan art.

Duble's best known works were human figures or heads, worked in stone, cement, and terracotta. Her sculpture, "Calling the Loa, Haiti" won the Anna Hyatt Huntington Prize in 1938, and "Last Migration" won the Speyer Prize in 1952. She had work in the fiftieth anniversary show of the National Association of Women Painters and Sculptors in 1939. In 1940, Duble showed her sculptures from Haiti at the Dayton Art Institute; local arts editor Merab Eberle found the show's "voodooistic" theme disturbing, but agreed that Duble had "rhythmic sense and no small degree of ability to impart power." She was part of a three-woman show, at Grand Central Art Galleries in 1947, with Cornelia Chapin and Marion Sanford. She "tackles themes that are deeply felt, in forms that are impressionistically modeled and full of dramatic tensions," wrote a Philadelphia reviewer in 1950, adding "Lu Duble's work must be respected but can't always be enjoyed."

She was a member of the National Association of Women Painters and Sculptors from 1937, a fellow of the National Sculpture Society, elected in 1937, and a member of the National Academy of Design from 1942. She was part of a group of women artists called informally "the Guild ladies", including Dorothy Dehner, Helen Wilson, Rhys Caparn and Helena Simkhovitch. Among her students were artists Ray Eames and Mercedes Matter.

== Personal life ==
Davies married twice, first in 1917 to Jesse Clyde Duble, and second to Alfred Geiffert Jr., a landscape architect. She was widowed when Geiffert died in 1957. She spent summers in Woodstock, New York in her later years. She died in 1970, in Woodstock, aged 74 years. She was survived by her sister, Gwen, also an artist.
