= Marguerite Caetani =

American journalist (1880–1963)

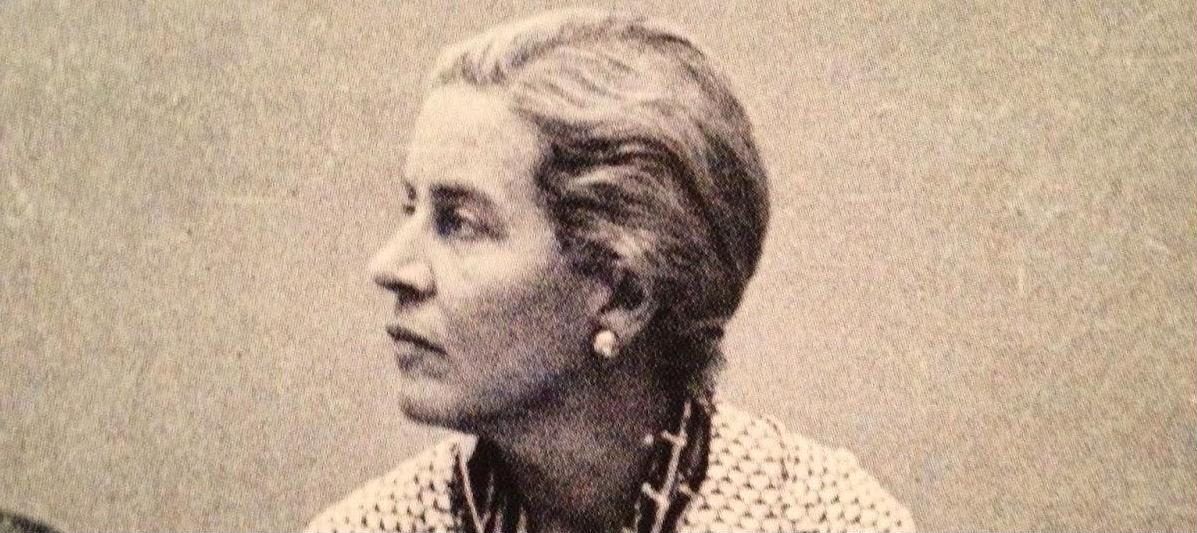
- Born: Marguerite Gilbert Chapin; 24 June 1880; Waterford, Connecticut, US
- Died: 17 December 1963 (aged 83); Cisterna di Latina, Lazio, Italy
- Title: Princess of Bassiano
- Spouse: Roffredo Caetani
- Children: 2
- Relatives: Cornelia Van Auken Chapin (half-sister); Katherine Garrison Chapin (half-sister); Schuyler Chapin (half-nephew)

Marguerite Gilbert Caetani, Princess of Bassiano, Duchess of Sermoneta (née Chapin; 24 June 1880 – 17 December 1963), was an American-born publisher, journalist, art collector, and patron of the arts. She married an Italian aristocrat and became the founder and director of the literary journals Commerce (fr) (in France) and Botteghe Oscure (in Italy).

== Early life ==
A daughter of Lelia Chapin (née Gilbert; 1857–1885) and Lindley Hoffman Chapin (1854–1896), Marguerite was born on 24 June 1880 in Waterford, Connecticut into a wealthy and cultured New England family. After her mother's death in 1885, her father remarried to Cornelia Garrison Van Auken in 1888, with whom he had Cornelia Van Auken Chapin, a sculptor, Katherine Garrison Chapin (a poet who was the wife of the U.S. Attorney General Francis Biddle), and Lindley Hoffman Paul Chapin (father of Schuyler Chapin, the General Manager of the Metropolitan Opera).

A direct descendant of Puritan settler Deacon Samuel Chapin, her paternal grandfather was Abel Chapin, a son of U.S. Representative Chester W. Chapin, president of the Boston and Albany Railroad. Her maternal grandparents were Frederic E. Gibert and Margaret E. (née Reynolds) Gibert.

Orphaned by her parents at a young age, she went to Paris in 1902 to study singing with the tenor Jean de Reszke.

== Career ==
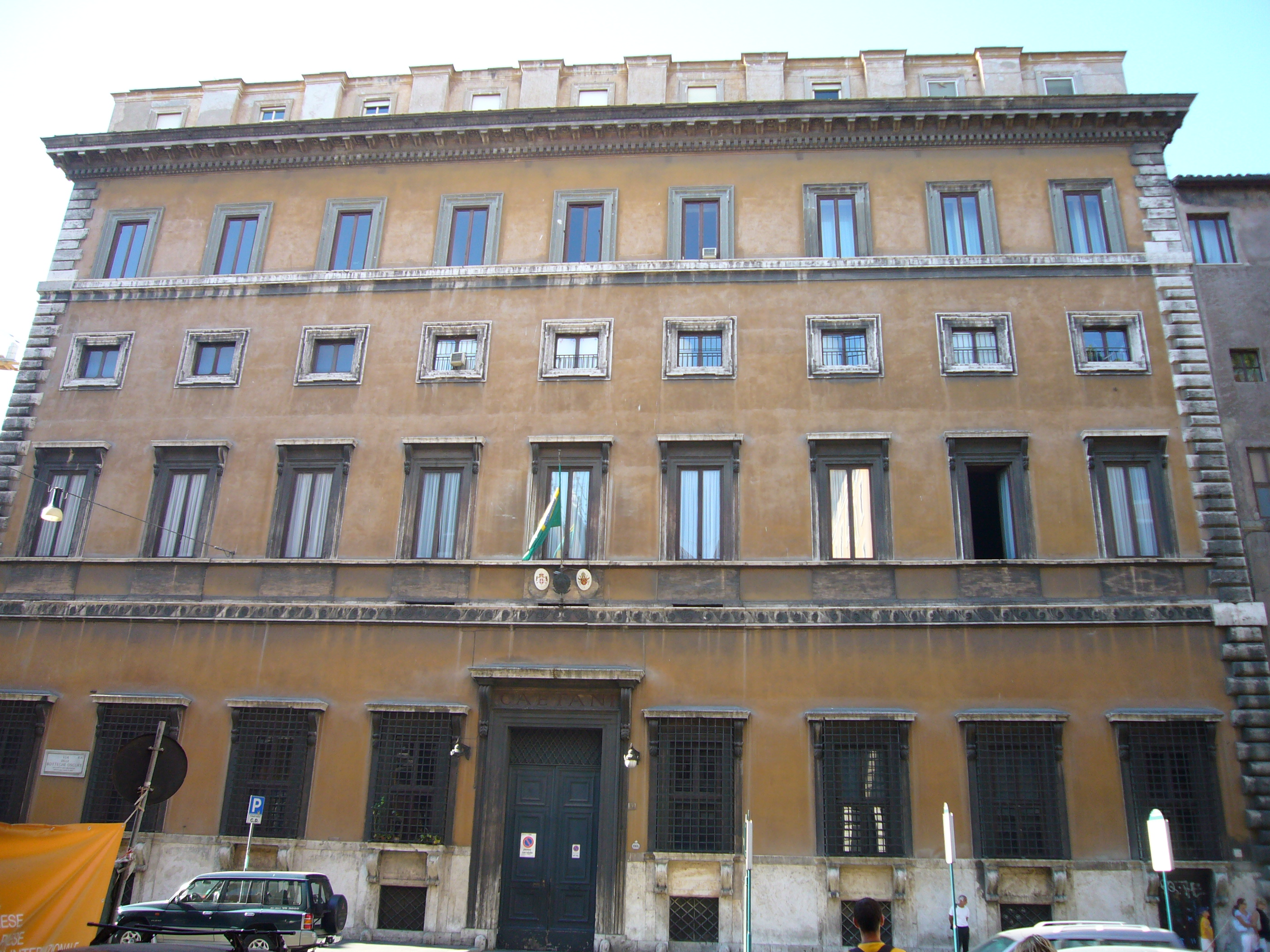
The Palazzo Mattei Caetani, on via Botteghe Oscure in Rome

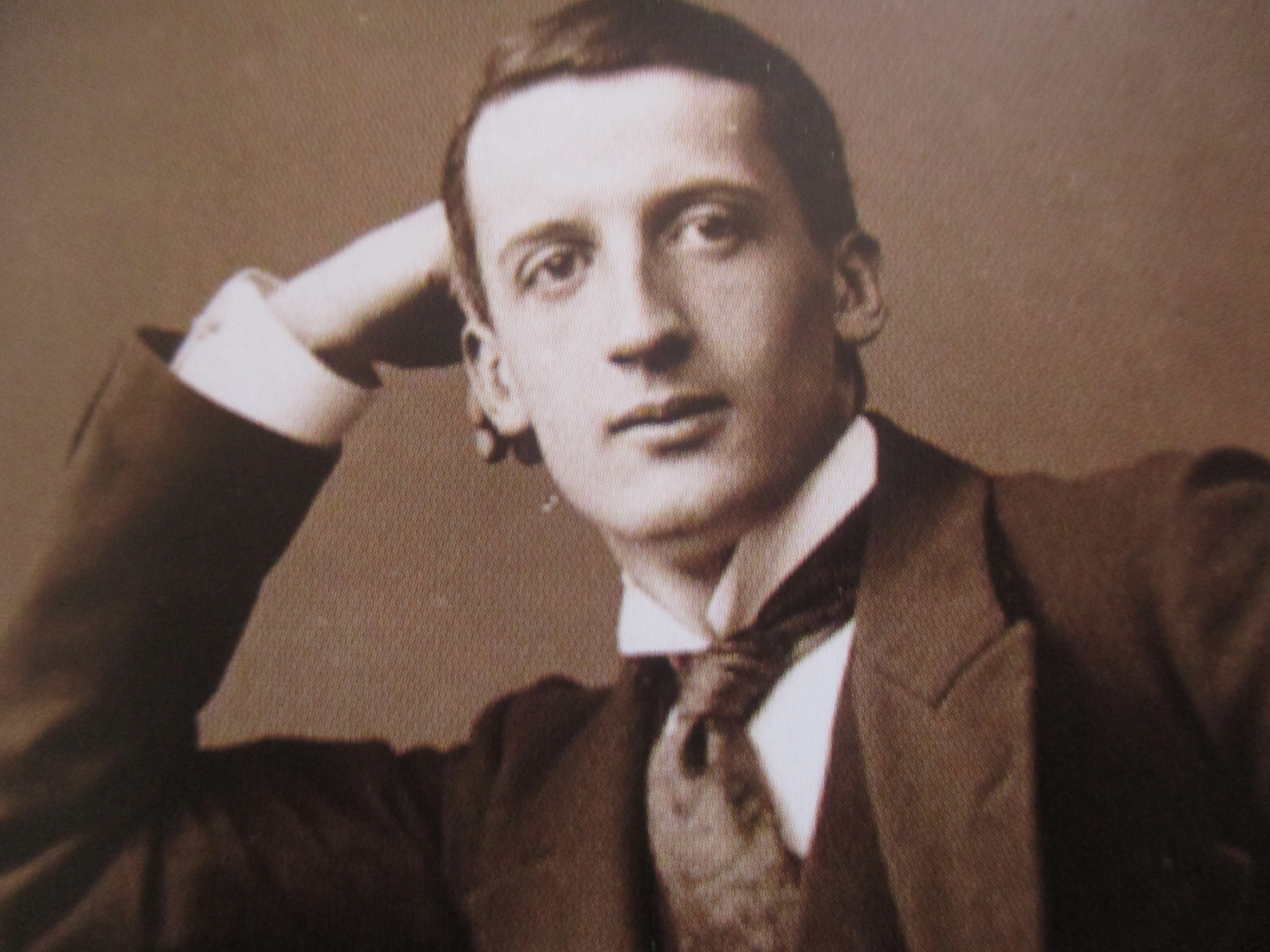
Her husband, Prince Roffredo Caetani

In Paris, the Caetanis frequented the artistic and literary world and were friends with Paul Valéry, Saint-John Perse, Valery Larbaud, Leon-Paul Fargue, and Adrienne Monnier. In 1924 Marguerite Caetani founded the literary journal Commerce, which was published until 1932. With articles in three languages (French, Italian and English), Commerce published poets and writers already famous (such as James Joyce), but also younger artists, allowing them to make their works known.

In 1932, the Caetanis returned to Italy and settled in the castle of Sermoneta. After the Second World War, and the death of her son Camillo in December 1940, the family settled in the Roman residence of Palazzo Mattei Caetani in Via delle Botteghe Oscure.

In 1948, Marguerite Caetani founded a new journal, Botteghe Oscure, partly similar to Commerce, but now in five languages: English, French, Italian, German and Spanish. With the help of Giorgio Bassani, Botteghe Oscure published some of the most important works of poetry and prose of the time. In 1950 Princess Caetani published an anthology in English of the writers who had contributed to the journal: An Anthology of New Italian Writers (printed in Rome, but distributed by New Directions). Botteghe Oscure ceased publishing in 1960, due to financial difficulties, thereafter retiring to Ninfa.

== Personal life ==
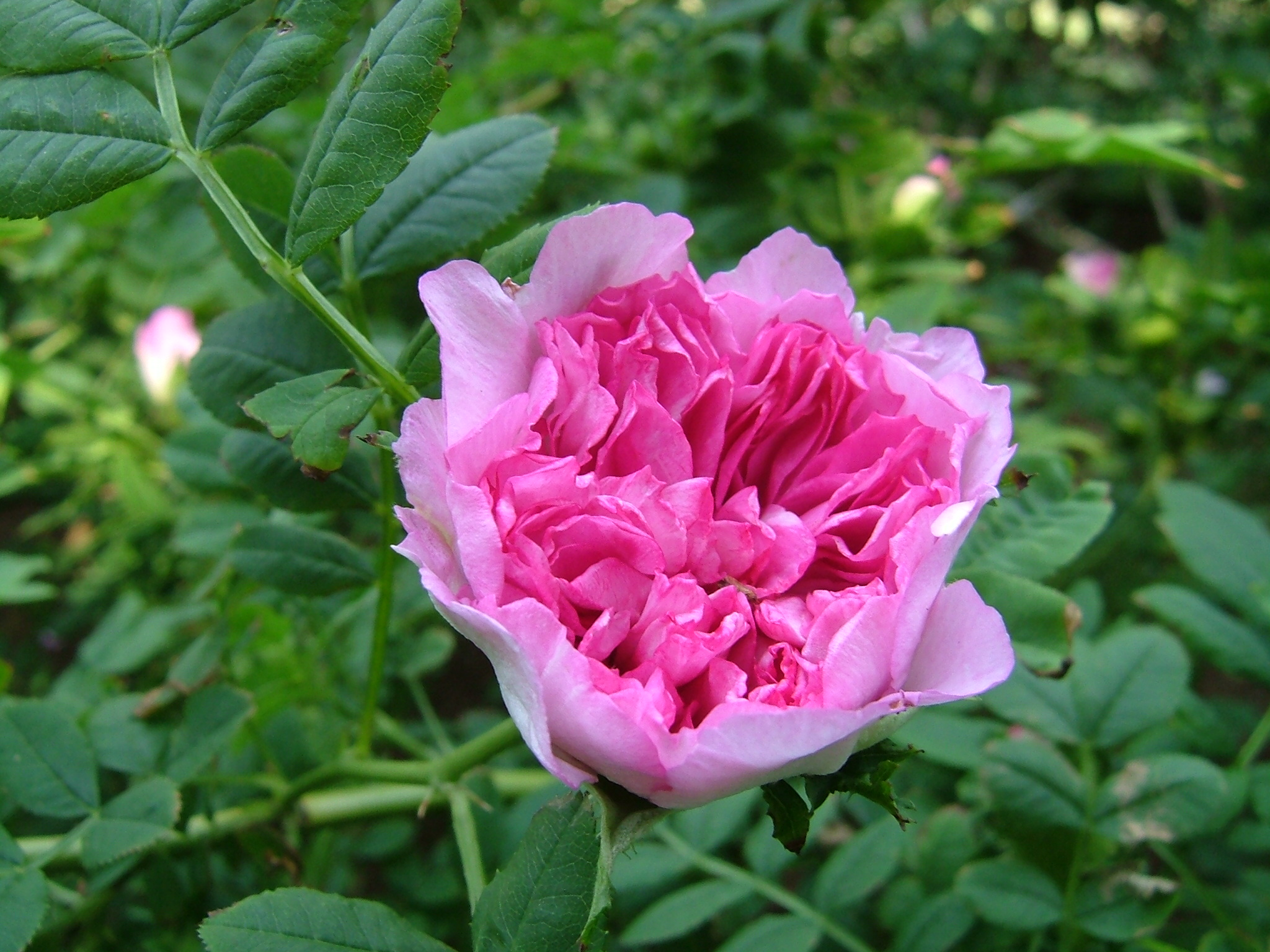
Rosa roxburghii

In 1911, she met, and married, the composer Roffredo Caetani (1871–1961), Prince of Bassiano and last Duke of Sermoneta. The couple settled in the villa Romaine in Versailles, and had two children:

- Lelia Calista Ada Caetani (1913–1977), who married the Hon. Hubert Howard, a son of Esmé Howard, 1st Baron Howard of Penrith.
- Camillo Gelasio Caetani (1915–1940), who was killed on 15 December 1940 on the Albanian front.

Princess Caetani died at Ninfa on 17 December 1963.

=== Garden of Ninfa ===
Marguerite Chapin, was also a garden enthusiast, introduced many hundreds of plants to the Garden of Ninfa, most of which were bought from English Nurseries. From 1949 to 1990 Hillier & Sons was the main supplier for the Caetanis. At her first visit to the nursery, Marguerite ordered 128 rose cultivars. Plantings have continued and there are now some 200 roses at Ninfa. Many of these are unusual, such as the double pink form of Rosa roxburghii (1825)—which is called the 'Chestnut Rose', Rosa Crépuscule with fabulous scented coppery flowers.
