= Duble =

Duble may refer to:

- Charles E. Duble (1884–1960), American band musician and composer
- Lu Duble (1896–1970), born Lucinda Davies, English-born American artist
- Duble Sidekick, South Korean music producer and songwriting duo
- Duble, official currency of the Republic of Slowjamastan micronation
