= Schuyler Chapin =

American arts administrator

Schuyler Garrison Chapin

General Manager of the Metropolitan Opera
- In office 1972–1974
- Preceded by: Göran Gentele
- Succeeded by: Anthony A. Bliss

Personal details
- Born: Schuyler Garrison Chapin; February 13, 1923 New York City, U.S.
- Died: March 7, 2009 (aged 86) New York City, U.S.
- Spouse(s): Elizabeth Steinway (m. 1947–1993; her death); Catia Zoullas Mortimer(m. 1995)
- Education: Millbrook School
- Awards: Légion d'honneur (2002)

Schuyler Garrison Chapin (February 13, 1923 – March 7, 2009) was a General Manager of the Metropolitan Opera, and later Commissioner of Cultural Affairs for New York City during the administration of Mayor Rudy Giuliani. He also served as the dean of the Columbia University School of the Arts.

== Early life and family ==
Schuyler Garrison Chapin was born on February 13, 1923. He was the son of Lindley Hoffman Paul Chapin (1888–1938) and Leila Howard Chapin (née Burden; 1899–1967). His father's sisters were poet Katherine Garrison Chapin and sculptor Cornelia Van Auken Chapin; his father's half-sister was publisher Marguerite Caetani.

== Career ==
While still a teenager, in the 1930s, he began accompanying millionaire widow and former actress Eleanor Belmont to the Metropolitan Opera. He attended the Millbrook School in 1940, where he was very active in the performing and musical arts, however, he did not graduate from high school, nor college, but was the recipient of numerous university honors. He became a pilot during World War II.

By 1953, he had become Jascha Heifetz's tour manager. Around this time, he also befriended Leonard Bernstein, several of whose live recordings, including the Grammy award-winning Beethoven's Birthday (1970), Chapin produced.

In 1963, he was named vice-president of Lincoln Center and co-founded the Film Society of Lincoln Center in 1969. In 1972, he accepted the position of General Manager of the Metropolitan Opera after the previous GM, Göran Gentele, died in a car accident before the opening of his first season. Chapin stayed on at the Met for four years, subsequently becoming Dean of Columbia University's Graduate School of the Arts. During Chapin's tenure at Columbia, enrollment doubled, and he raised $7 million and strengthened the fine-arts curriculum. He remained there for 10 years, being kept on as Dean emeritus. He then moved on to the job of vice president of Steinway & Sons before becoming the cultural affairs commissioner of New York City from 1994 to 2001.

In 2002, he was awarded France's Légion d'honneur, 82 years after his father; L. H. Paul Chapin, a World War I liaison officer between General Pershing and Marshall Foch, received the same honor. He also wrote several books, including Leonard Bernstein: Notes From a Friend and was also a Board Member Emeritus In Memoriam at The Center for Arts Education.

== Personal life ==
On March 15, 1947, he married his first wife, Elizabeth Steinway (1925-1993). Steinway was the daughter of Theodore E. Steinway and Ruth (née Davis) Steinway. The Steinways were descendants of Henry E. Steinway (the founder of Steinway & Sons). Chapin's best man was his uncle by marriage, Francis Biddle, the former United States Attorney General. Together, they had four sons:

- Henry Burden Chapin
- Theodore Steinway Chapin
- Samuel Garrison Chapin, who married Caroline Shippen Davis in 1982
- Miles Chapin (born December 6, 1954)

After his wife died in 1993, Chapin met and married his second wife, divorcee Catia Zoullas Mortimer, in 1995. Mayor Rudy Giuliani officiated the marriage at Gracie Mansion, New York City.

Preceded by Göran Gentele	General Manager of the Metropolitan Opera; 1972–1974	Succeeded by Anthony A. Bliss
