= Katherine Garrison Chapin =

American poet and playwright

- Chapin c. 1942
- Born: September 4, 1890; Waterford, Connecticut, US
- Died: December 30, 1977 (aged 87); Devon, Pennsylvania, US
- Education: Miss Keller's School; Columbia University
- Spouse: Francis Biddle (m. 1918)
- Relatives: Charlotte Mason (aunt); Cornelia Chapin (sister); Marguerite Caetani (half-sister); Schuyler Chapin (nephew)
- Writing career
- Years active: 1920s–1950s
- Notable works: Lament for the Stolen (1938); And They Lynched Him on a Tree (1940); Plain-Chant for America (1941)

Katherine Garrison Chapin (September 4, 1890 – December 30, 1977), sometimes known by her married name Katherine Biddle, was an American poet, librettist, and playwright. She is best known for two collaborations with composer William Grant Still: And They Lynched Him on a Tree (1940) and Plain-Chant for America (1941).

Chapin began publishing poems in the late 1920s, in the popular press and in literary journals including Poetry. Many of her works, including her two joint compositions with Still, were musical libretti. Her corpus covers a variety of subjects, but evinces a particular fascination with politics and racial justice. Critics regarded her work as skilled, traditional, and somewhat lacking in feeling.

== Life ==
=== Family ===
Katherine Garrison Chapin was born to a wealthy, well-connected family in Gilded Age New York. Her mother Cornelia Garrison Van Auken (1865–1925) was an actress. Her father Lindley Hoffman Chapin (1854–1896) was a Manhattan lawyer who graduated from Harvard Law School in 1874. Her parents were married on February 14, 1888, at 421 Fifth Avenue, Cornelia's family home.

Her sister Cornelia became a sculptor. Her brother Lindley Hoffman Paul Chapin was the father of Schuyler Chapin. Her older paternal half-sister was the publisher Marguerite Caetani.

=== New York ===
Chapin was born on September 4, 1890, in Waterford, Connecticut—the location of Rock Lawn, the Chapins' ancestral summer home. She grew up in Manhattan. As a child, she often attended operas at the old Metropolitan Opera House on 39th Street, which was near her family's brownstone at 5 West 37th Street in Murray Hill.

Her elementary education was at Miss Keller's School, a private school scholar Laurie Dennett calls "less-expensive and more socially inclusive" than St. Mark's, to which her brother was sent. An 1896 article in The Illustrated American describes Miss Keller's as an exemplar of cutting edge educational methods, noting that "[p]racticality is the motto of the school, and the lessons are invariably taught with relevant illustration". Reflecting on her education, Chapin called Miss Keller's "somewhat experimental". Chapin also attended a drama school called the Theatre Guild School, presumably run by the Theatre Guild. (Note: It is not clear which Theatre Guild School Chapin attended. One such school was founded in the 1920s and lasted for only two years; another was located in Cranford, New Jersey, and was in operation as of 1973.)

Chapin later attended Columbia University for "postgraduate work", (Note: It is not clear when Chapin attended Columbia.) where she studied under Franz Boas, Max Eastman, and Kurt Schindler. By her time at Columbia, she was engaged to Francis Biddle. Biddle would serve as a judge at the Nuremberg trials and Attorney General under Franklin D. Roosevelt. They married on April 27, 1918.

=== Philadelphia and Washington ===
Chapin lived in Philadelphia in the 1930s; Francis had grown up there and practiced law in the city for many years. Francis was appointed to the National Labor Relations Board in 1934 and the couple moved to Washington, D.C. Francis and Katherine likely moved back to Philadelphia when Francis briefly served as a judge on the United States Court of Appeals for the Third Circuit, as a letter from Chapin to William Grant Still indicates that they were moving back to Washington in the late 1930s when Francis was appointed Solicitor General.

Francis and Katherine had two boys, Edmund and Garrison. Garrison died at age 7; Chapin wrote the poem "Bright Mariner" (1930) in his memory.

Allen Tate, who would name her one of the inaugural Fellows in American Letters of the Library of Congress was a friend of Chapin's, as was Alexis Léger, a poet who wrote as Saint-John Perse. She was a correspondent of philosopher Alain LeRoy Locke, with whom she developed the concept for And They Lynched Him on a Tree (1940); and of composer Samuel Barber, who composed a score for her poem "Between Dark and Dark".

As a Fellow in American Letters, in which capacity she served from 1944 to 1954, Chapin was on the jury for the first Bollingen Prize in 1948. That year, the prize went to Cantos by Ezra Pound. Chapin was one of only two jurors who voted against Pound. She thought it would be "unwise for the Library of Congress to single out a traitor for recognition; the traitor could not be separated from the poet—his anti-democratic, anti-Semitic fulminations ran through his whole work". In addition to her service on the Bollingen Prize jury, Chapin judged the National Book Award for Poetry and the Shelley Memorial Award in 1953 and 1959, respectively; and lectured at the Library of Congress.

Katherine remained in Washington for just under 40 years after her move in 1934, presumably with a short interlude in the mid-1930s during Biddle's term as a circuit judge; the family kept a house in Philadelphia as late as 1938. She moved back to Pennsylvania following a stroke in 1973, and died in Devon on December 30, 1977.

== Poetry and libretti ==
Chapin began to publish in the late 1920s. Her works appeared in Harper's Magazine, Scribner's Magazine, Saturday Review, North American Review, Poetry and Ladies' Home Journal.

=== Lament for the Stolen ===
Lament for the Stolen (1938), a poem about kidnapping written not long after the Lindbergh kidnapping and apparently with the Lindbergh tragedy in mind, became the libretto for a composition by Harl McDonald. McDonald wrote his score in July and August 1938. The composition, a fantasia, was about 20 minutes long.

The Philadelphia Orchestra premiered Lament for the Stolen on December 30, 1938, under the direction of Eugene Ormandy. The New York Times, in a notice for And They Lynched Him on a Tree, called Lament "a dirge for the mother of a child who has been stolen and killed". Philosopher Alain Locke praised Chapin's writing in Lament, in letters to Chapin and to Charlotte Mason, but disparaged McDonald's score.

=== And They Lynched Him on a Tree ===
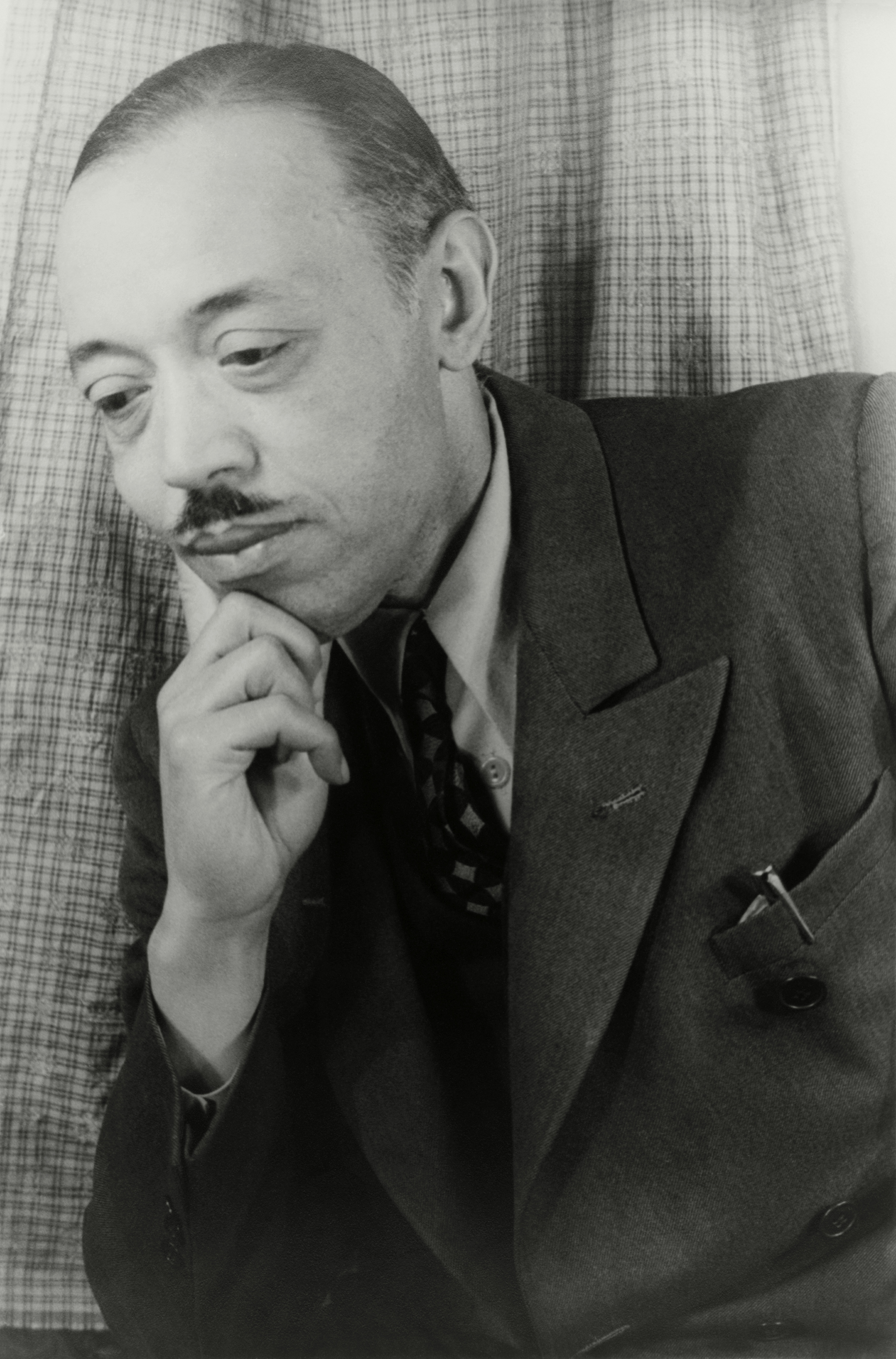
William Grant Still in 1949. Chapin collaborated with Still on And They Lynched Him on a Tree (1940) and Plain-Chant for America (1941).

Chapin wrote And They Lynched Him on a Tree (1940) while a federal anti-lynching bill sponsored by Representative Joseph A. Gavagan was being debated in the United States Congress; scholar Catherine Reef argues that Chapin wrote And They Lynched Him "to persuade Congress to pass" the legislation. The bill failed to pass the Senate three months after And They Lynched Him premiered. The work, set to music by William Grant Still, was Still's first "large-scale choral-orchestral work". The composition features two choruses, one Black and one white.

Chapin's aunt Charlotte Osgood Mason, a white patron of artists of the Harlem Renaissance, conceived the work in collaboration with Alain Locke, likely in spring 1939. According to scholar Wayne D. Shirley, the "first clear reference" to And They Lynched Him appears in a letter from Locke to Chapin dated April 20, 1939, in which Locke mentions Still as a possible collaborator. Locke introduced the poem to Still in a letter of August 9, 1939:

Mrs. Biddle, who writes as Katherine Garrison Chapin, has done a powerful poem on lynching, really an epic indictment but by way of pure poetry not propaganda. … [And They Lynched Him on a Tree] is more powerful than the Lament for the Stolen, but has the same skill at transforming a melodramatic situation into one of tragic depth and beauty.

Still wrote to Chapin just over a week later, on August 18, 1939, to express his enthusiasm for the project: "I've long wished to add my voice to the general feeling against lynching, and have been waiting for the proper vehicle to present itself". Chapin had prepared initial drafts of the text by September 1939; Still started to write the score on September 9.

The piece premiered on June 25, 1940, at Lewisohn Stadium to an audience of 13,000. Artur Rodziński conducted the New York Philharmonic; the choral sections were sung by a choir directed by Wen Talbert and the New York MacDowell Club, known as the Schola Cantorum. Talbert, a pianist, cellist, and jazz bandleader, led the Negro Chorus of the Federal Theatre Project, which performed in several Federal Theatre productions including Bassa Moona and How Long Brethren? (1937), a dance by Helen Tamiris. The program also included a performance by Paul Robeson.

A notice by Still's wife Verna Arvey in the New York Times in advance of the premiere wrote:

… Miss Chapin's poem is the voicing of her deep conviction that lynching is a serious flaw in the fabric of our American democracy, and her belief that this conviction is held by the majority of Americans in the South and the North.

=== Plain-Chant for America ===
Soon after And They Lynched Him, Still and Chapin collaborated for a second time on Plain-Chant for America (1941). According to Chapin's New York Times obituary, she regarded the work as "her reaffirmation of democracy". The poem is dedicated to President Franklin D. Roosevelt.

In an article on Plain-Chant, Arvey quotes Chapin on the genesis of the work:

An American poem had been germinating in my mind for a long time, but the final circumstance that thrust it into being was the fact that I had spent a few days in the company of some persons who were sympathetic with the Fascists, whose talk showed me vividly the gap between totalitarianism and the American democracy in which I believed. The emotion of the poem began there; it found completion when we stood behind President Roosevelt in the sunshine at Key West … while he made a fine radio broadcast opening the San Francisco Fair.

The piece, written for orchestra and baritone, was complete by early October 1941—although Chapin said in an interview at the time that it was written in 1938. It premiered on October 23, 1941, of that year at Carnegie Hall. John Barbirolli conducted the New York Philharmonic, and Wilbur Evans delivered the baritone solo.

=== Reception ===
Critics have generally regarded Chapin's work as skillful but unoriginal.

Harriet Monroe, reviewing Chapin's collection Outside of the World in Poetry in 1932, noted "the quietly meditative tone of the poems, the poet's sensitiveness to the beauty of common experiences, and her compact and imaginative expression of them". However, Monroe did express some reserve, seeing "nothing strikingly original" in the collection. Monroe thought "Nancy Hanks", a poem about the birth of Abraham Lincoln to Nancy Hanks Lincoln, was the "most ambitious poem in the book".

A New York Times review of Plain-Chant for America: Poems and Ballads (1942), although it compared Chapin's work favorably with that of e e cummings, criticized her for a perceived lack of "sensibility":

As in the case of John Peale Bishop, her poetry will augment the sphere of your sentiments without modifying your sensibility. Katharine Chapin has an ideology … but lacks a sufficient volume of texture in her technique to give her work the dualism of images and logical substance which makes for major poetry. … Katharine Chapin has in the main an ideology without a private sensibility to give her scope varied dimensions.

A review in Poetry of Chapin's last collection The Other Journey (1959), advanced a similarly lukewarm assessment:

Seriousness and technical competence, even together, do not necessarily sustain one's interest in a group of poems. Katherine Garrison Chapin's The Other Journey makes that quite clear. It is hard to find anything actually wrong with the book except that it is not particularly exciting. … The whole book is curiously lacking in personal impact …

Robert Hillyer, however, reviewing The Other Journey in The New York Times, said it showed an "easy lyric grace" and "unobstructed communication".

Turner, in a biographical sketch, writes that "in poetic technique [Chapin] is barely influenced by the modernist poets. Her lyrics are chiefly in rhyme and meter, controlled but not exceptionally tight or brilliant, and in no way innovative".

The Academy of American Poets nominated Chapin for the Presidential Medal of Freedom in 1975. The nomination was endorsed by several senators and Nelson Rockefeller, the Vice President of the United States, but she was ultimately not selected for the honor.

== Drama ==
Chapin's play Sojourner Truth, about the early years of the historical figure of the same name, was produced by the American Negro Theater in 1948. It was directed by Osceola Macarthy Adams (by then known as Osceola Archer) and starred Muriel Smith. According to a lecture by Josephine Jacobsen, Sojourner Truth "ran for many weeks in Harlem".

== Works ==
=== Criticism ===
- "The Quality of Poetry". Poetry. 59 (11): 90–95. November 1941. ISSN 0032-2032.
- Chapin, Katherine Garrison (1970). "Poet of Wide Horizons: A Note on Saint-John Perse". The Quarterly Journal of the Library of Congress. 27 (2): 104–108. ISSN 0041-7939. JSTOR 29781389.

=== Drama ===
- The Tapestry of the Duchess (play, 1925). Unpublished.
- Sojourner Truth (play, 1948). Unpublished.

=== Poems ===
- "Sixth Sense; Moon Shadow; At Gettysburg; Monument". Poetry. 47 (6): 318–321. March 1936. ISSN 0032-2032. JSTOR 20580315.
- "Interval of Peace; Holiday 1941; Pastorale; Evening; This Lonely Light". Poetry. 59 (4): 204–207. January 1942. ISSN 0032-2032. JSTOR 20582869.
- Chapin, Katherine Garrison (May 1958). "Butterflies". Poetry. 92 (1): 77. ISSN 0032-2032. JSTOR 20586974.

=== Poetry collections ===
- Outside of the World. New York: Duffield and Company. 1930. OCLC 771159.
- Bright Mariner. New York: Duffield and Green. 1933. OCLC 1051582715. Chapbook featuring woodcuts by Wharton Esherick, written to memorialize Chapin's son Garrison after his death at age 7.
- Time Has No Shadow. New York: Dodd, Mead & Company. 1936. OCLC 609639224 – via Internet Archive.
- Lament for the Stolen: A Poem for a Chorus. New York: Centaur Press. 1938.
- And They Lynched Him on a Tree: For Double Mixed Chorus and Contralto Solo, Narrator and Orchestra. New York: J. Fischer & Brothers. 1941.
- Plain-Chant for America: Poems and Ballads. New York: Harper. 1942. OCLC 610576110.
- Harbor Night. New York: Carl Fischer. 1945. OCLC 10133549. A poem set to music.
- Chapin, Katherine Garrison (1959). The Other Journey: Poems New and Selected. Minneapolis: University of Minnesota Press. ISBN 9780816671281. JSTOR 10.5749/j.cttts7xx. OCLC 8063762.

== Sources ==
- Block, Maxine; Rothe, Anna, eds. (1944). "Chapin, Katherine Garrison". Current Biography. New York: H. W. Wilson Company. pp. 121–123. OCLC 1029009174.
- Dennett, Laurie (2016). An American Princess: The Remarkable Life of Marguerite Chapin Caetani. Montreal: McGill-Queen's University Press. ISBN 978-0-7735-4818-3.
- Monroe, Harriet (June 1932). "Slight Songs, Review of Outside of the World by Katherine Garrison Chapin". Poetry. 40 (3): 168–169. ISSN 0032-2032. JSTOR 20578561.
- Reef, Catherine (2003). William Grant Still: African-American Composer. Morgan Reynolds Publishing. ISBN 1-931798-11-7. OCLC 51752187.
- Shirley, Wayne D. (Winter 1994). "William Grant Still's Choral Ballad And They Lynched Him on a Tree". American Music. 12 (4): 425–461. doi:10.2307/3052342. JSTOR 3052342.
- Turner, Alberta (1979). "Katherine Garrison Chapin". In Maniero, Lina (ed.). American Women Writers: A Critical Reference Guide from Colonial Times to the Present. Vol. 1. New York: Frederick Ungar Publishing Company. pp. 334–335. ISBN 9780804431514. OCLC 892809579 – via Internet Archive.
