= Marion Sanford =

American sculptor (1904–1987)

- Born: February 9, 1904; Guelph, Ontario, Canada
- Died: February 1987; Eastbourne, England
- Known for: Sculpture
- Partner: Cornelia Van Auken Chapin
- Awards: Guggenheim Fellowship

Marion Sanford (February 9, 1904 - February 1987) was an American sculptor known for her bronze portraits of women engaged in everyday domestic activities.

== Early life and career ==
Sanford was born to American parents in Guelph, Ontario and was raised on a farm in Warren, Pennsylvania. Her artistic education began at Pratt Institute, where she studied painting in 1922. She later worked as a stage and costume designer before developing an interest in sculpture. At the Art Students League of New York, Sanford studied sculpture under Leo Lentelli and Robert Laurent, experimenting with the direct-carving method. She also worked as an apprentice to artist Brenda Putnam between 1937 and 1940. Sanford provided pen and ink illustrations for Putnam's book, The Sculptor's Way, and is referred to by Putnam in that book as "my pupil, assistant and colleague."

In 1937, Sanford had her first exhibition of sculptures. The same year, her statue Diana was awarded a prize by the National Association of Women Painters and Sculptors. In 1939, she completed a plaster bas-relief of black workers weighing cotton, which had been commissioned with funds provided by the Treasury Section of Fine Arts for the Winder, Georgia post office as part of a New Deal arts initiative. Sanford also was included in the 1939 New York World's Fair exhibition of American art, and won Guggenheim Fellowships in 1941 and 1942.

Sanford is best known for her "Women at Work" (also referred to as "working women") series of bronze sculptures depicting women doing household chores such as picking apples (Harvest, 1941), preparing food (Butterwoman, 1942) and washing clothes (Scrubwoman, n.d.). These works were inspired by memories of her Swedish neighbors working on their farm when she was a child in Pennsylvania. In a 1947 interview, Sanford stated that she feels there is a "beauty in movements one makes while performing chores" as well as an "unconscious grace in the succession of movements as the work proceeds."

Other notable works include De Profundis (1943), a portrait of a grief-stricken woman for which she received the Watrous Gold Medal at the National Academy of Design, and Dawn (1947), a portrait of a seated teenaged girl, which won another award from the Academy. In the summer of 1949 she was one of 250 sculptors who exhibited in the 3rd Sculpture International held at the Philadelphia Museum of Art. Other exhibitions include those at the Newport Art Association, Architectural League of New York, and the Whitney Museum of American Art.

Sanford was a founding member of the Sculptors Guild and also a member in the National Sculpture Society.

== Personal life and death ==
Sanford began working with fellow sculptor Cornelia Chapin in the late 1930s. During the Second World War, they redecorated and maintained the former studio of Gutzon Borglum on 38th Street in New York City. The two artists eventually relocated to Lakeville, Connecticut in 1952. Chapin often modeled for Sanford's work.

After Chapin's death in 1972, Sanford relocated to Eastbourne, England, where she lived and worked until her own death in February 1987.

The two artists' combined papers are in the Smithsonian Institution's Archives of American Art as the "Marion Sanford and Cornelia Chapin papers, 1929-1988."
