= Ray Eames =

American artist and designer (1912–1988)

- Born: Ray-Bernice Alexandra Kaiser; December 15, 1912; Sacramento, California, U.S.
- Died: August 21, 1988 (aged 75); Los Angeles, California, U.S.
- Burial place: Calvary Cemetery
- Occupations: Artist, designer, filmmaker
- Years active: 1936–1978
- Known for: Artist with Allied Artists Association, Hoffmann Studio and designer at The Eames Office, The India Report

Ray-Bernice Alexandra Kaiser Eames (née Kaiser; December 15, 1912 – August 21, 1988) was an American artist and designer who worked in a variety of media.

In creative partnership with her husband, Charles Eames, she was responsible for groundbreaking contributions in the fields of architecture, graphic design, textile design, film, and furniture. The Eames Office is most famous for its furniture, which is still being produced. Together as a couple, the Eameses are considered one of the most influential creative forces of the 20th century.

During her lifetime, Ray Kaiser Eames received less credit than she has been given posthumously in art and design literature, museum shows, and documentary films.

== Biography ==
=== Early life ===
Ray Eames was born in Sacramento, California, to Alexander and Edna Burr Kaiser and had an older brother named Maurice. Edna was Episcopalian and Alexander had been raised Jewish, but did not practice. Eames and Maurice were brought up as Episcopalians. Bernice was known to her family as Ray Ray. Her mother was a housewife, and her father managed the vaudeville Empress Theater (now the Crest Theatre), in Sacramento, until 1920. He then became an insurance salesman, later owning a downtown office to better support his family.

The family lived in an apartment for much of Eames's early childhood and then moved to a bungalow outside of town. Her parents taught her to value both the natural world and objects that induce joy, which later inspired her inventions in furniture design and toys.

Eames came from a loving but overprotective home. Her elder sister died a few months after she was born, and her parents lived in fear that they would lose her, too. The overprotectiveness was further fueled by Eames's mother's anxiety that her "short, squat child might be deformed." Despite and because of this, Ray was close to her mother, living with her in California and New York until Edna's death in 1940. Eames was also close to her older brother, Maurice.

=== Work and education ===
==== Education ====
Ray graduated from Sacramento High School in February 1931. She was a member of the Art Association, the Big Sister Club, and the decorating committee for the senior dance.

After graduating in 1931, she spent a term at Sacramento Junior College before moving with her widowed mother to New York to be nearer her brother, then a West Point cadet.

In 1933, Ray graduated from the May Friend Bennett Women's College, in Millbrook, New York, (where her art teacher was Lu Duble) and moved to New York City to study Abstract Expressionist painting with Duble's mentor, Hans Hofmann.

==== New York Work ====
During the 1930s, Kaiser’s artistic career centered around her painting. In 1937, she became a founding member of the American Abstract Artists (AAA) group and exhibited paintings in its first show at Squibb Gallery April 3–17, 1937, New York City. The AAA group promoted abstract art at a time when major galleries refused to show it. She became a key figure in the New York art scene and developed friendships with painters Lee Krasner and Mercedes Matter, both important figures in Abstract Expressionism. While the Whitney Museum of American Art holds in its permanent collection a painting by Kaiser, little else remains of her art from this period.

Kaiser lived alone in New York City until she left the Hoffman Studio to return home to care for her ailing mother. Edna died in 1940.

==== Cranbrook Academy ====
By September 1940, Kaiser was entertaining the idea of moving back to California and building a house there. Her architect friend, Ben Baldwin, suggested she might first enjoy studying at the Cranbrook Academy of Art in Bloomfield Hills, Michigan. She took his advice and, once at Cranbrook, learned a variety of arts, moving beyond painting as her sole focus.

=== Life and work with Charles Eames ===
Also at Cranbrook, Kaiser met her husband-to-be, Charles Eames, who headed the school's industrial design department. Charles was a married man with one child, but he soon divorced his first wife. In 1941, he married Ray, who changed her name from Kaiser to Eames.

Settling in Los Angeles, the couple began a partnership in design and architecture.

== The Eames House ==
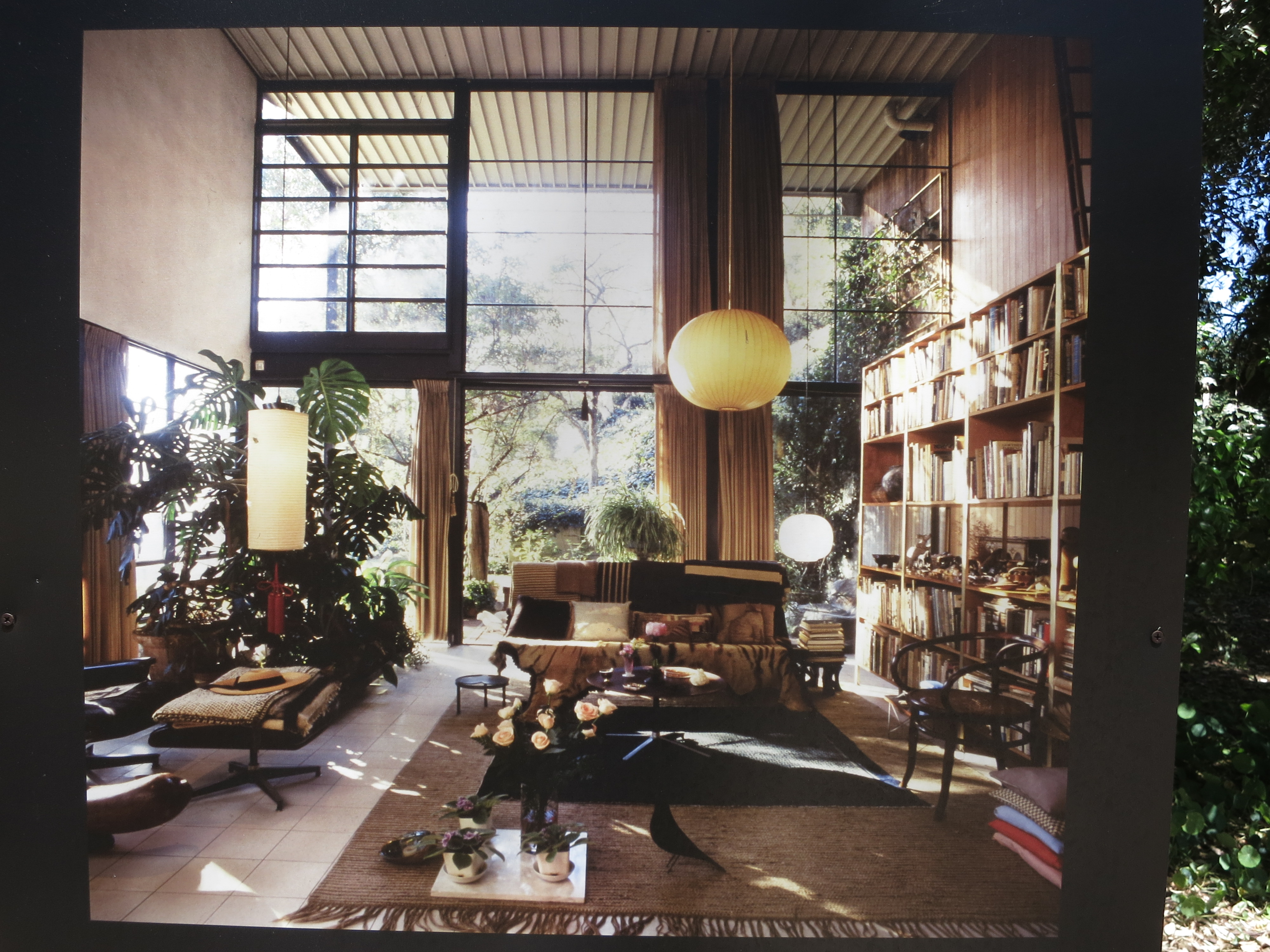
Eames House interior

Three years after arriving in Los Angeles, Charles and Ray were asked to participate in the Case Study House Program, a housing program sponsored by Arts & Architecture magazine in the hopes of showcasing examples of economically priced modern homes that used wartime and industrial materials. John Entenza, the owner and editor of Arts & Architecture, recognized the importance of Charles and Ray's thinking and design practices—alongside becoming a close friend of the couple. Charles and Eero Saarinen were hired to design Case Study House No. 8, which would be the residence of Charles and Ray, and Case Study House No. 9, which would house John Entenza, in 1945. The two homes (alongside other Case Study houses) would share a five-acre parcel of land in the Pacific Palisades neighborhood north of Santa Monica, which overlooked the Pacific Ocean. Because of post-war material rationing, the materials ordered for the first draft of the Eames House (called "the Bridge House") were backordered. Charles and Ray spent many days and nights on-site in the meadow picnicking, shooting arrows, and socializing with family, friends, and coworkers. They grew to love the eucalyptus grove, the expanse of land, and the unobstructed view of the ocean.

Eventually, they decided not to build the Bridge House, but instead reconfigured the materials to create two separate, glassy, block-like structures, nestled into the property’s hillside. Saarinen played no role in this second version of the house—instead, it became a collaboration between Charles and Ray. Once the materials arrived, in 1949, the buildings were erected in the period from February through December. The couple moved in on Christmas Eve, and the house became their sole residence for the rest of their lives. It remains a milestone of modern architecture.

The Eames Office designed a few other architectural works, many of which remained unrealized. But, in 1950, they succeeded in building the Herman Miller Showroom on Beverly Boulevard in Los Angeles and, in 1954, the De Pree House in Zeeland, Michigan, for Herman Miller founder’s son, Max De Pree, and his growing family. The unbuilt works include the Billy Wilder House, the prefabricated kit home known as the Kwikset House, and a national aquarium.

== The Eames Office ==
The designs of Ray and Charles were highly collaborative.

=== Graphic design ===
The Eames Office's graphic and commercial artwork, however, are largely attributable to Ray. Independent of her husband and the Eames Office, she designed 27 covers for Arts & Architecture, from 1942 to 1948. She also contributed to the 1948 Eames furniture advertisements for Herman Miller.

Ray's sense of form and color was the primary driver behind the Eames "look." Her sensibility made the difference between "good, very good—and Eames." While she did not make drawings, she was committed to documenting and tracking all the Office's projects, and in this capacity she embraced the responsibility of organizing and protecting the enormous collection of photographs that the office produced over the years.

=== Textile design ===
In 1947, the Eames Office created several textile designs, two of which—"Crosspatch" and "Sea Things"—were fabricated by Schiffer Prints, a company that also produced textiles by Salvador Dalí and Frank Lloyd Wright. Two of her patterns received awards in a textile competition organized by MoMA. She worked on graphics for advertising, magazine covers, posters, timelines, game boards, invitations, and business cards. Original examples of Ray Eames textiles can be found in many art museum collections, and some of her designs have been reissued by the Maharam company as part of its “Textiles of the Twentieth Century” collection.

=== Plywood design ===
Between 1943 and 1978, the Eames Office produced numerous furniture designs that were commercially manufactured, many with plywood. The first of the plywood pieces was a leg splint, made for the US Navy. The idea arose when one of the Eames' medical friends described the problems caused by standard metal splints, which had been mass produced using simple designs molded in one plane, rather the a more ergonomic compound curved design that better fit the human body. Ray's early background in fashion design proved useful here, as the splint resembled a clothing pattern with a system of darts to contour the plywood to the shape of a leg. The Navy commissioned the Eames' to mass produce 150,000 splints. Their company became the Molded Plywood Products Division of Evans Plywood. The splint profits enabled these emerging designers to expand their production and experiment with plywood furniture creations.

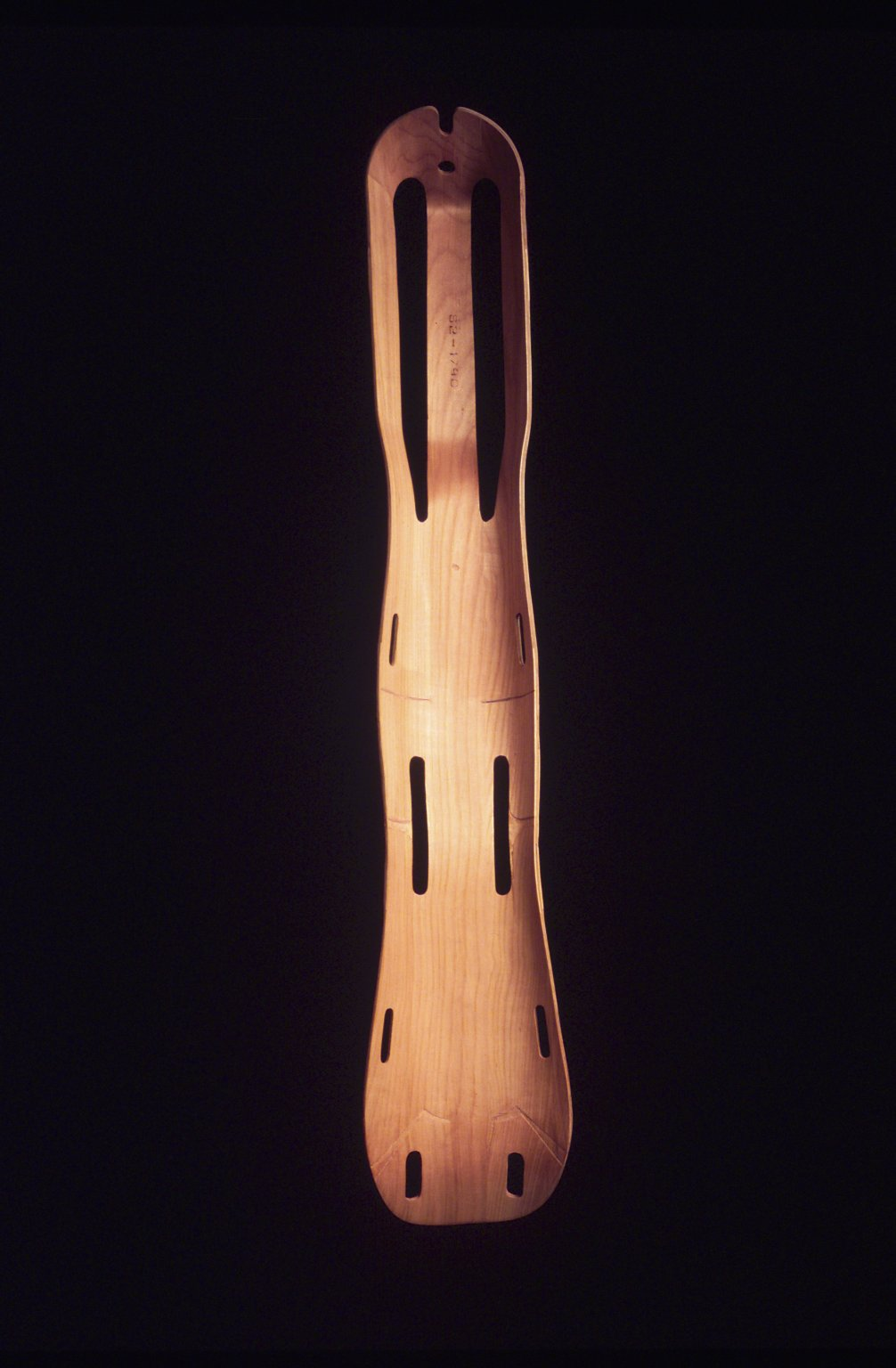
Leg Splint, designed for the Navy during WWII

The splint's use of bent plywood was a significant breakthrough for the couple's trademark design. They would later use similar bent plywood in their seminal Lounge Chair Wood (LCW) and the Eames Lounge Chair.

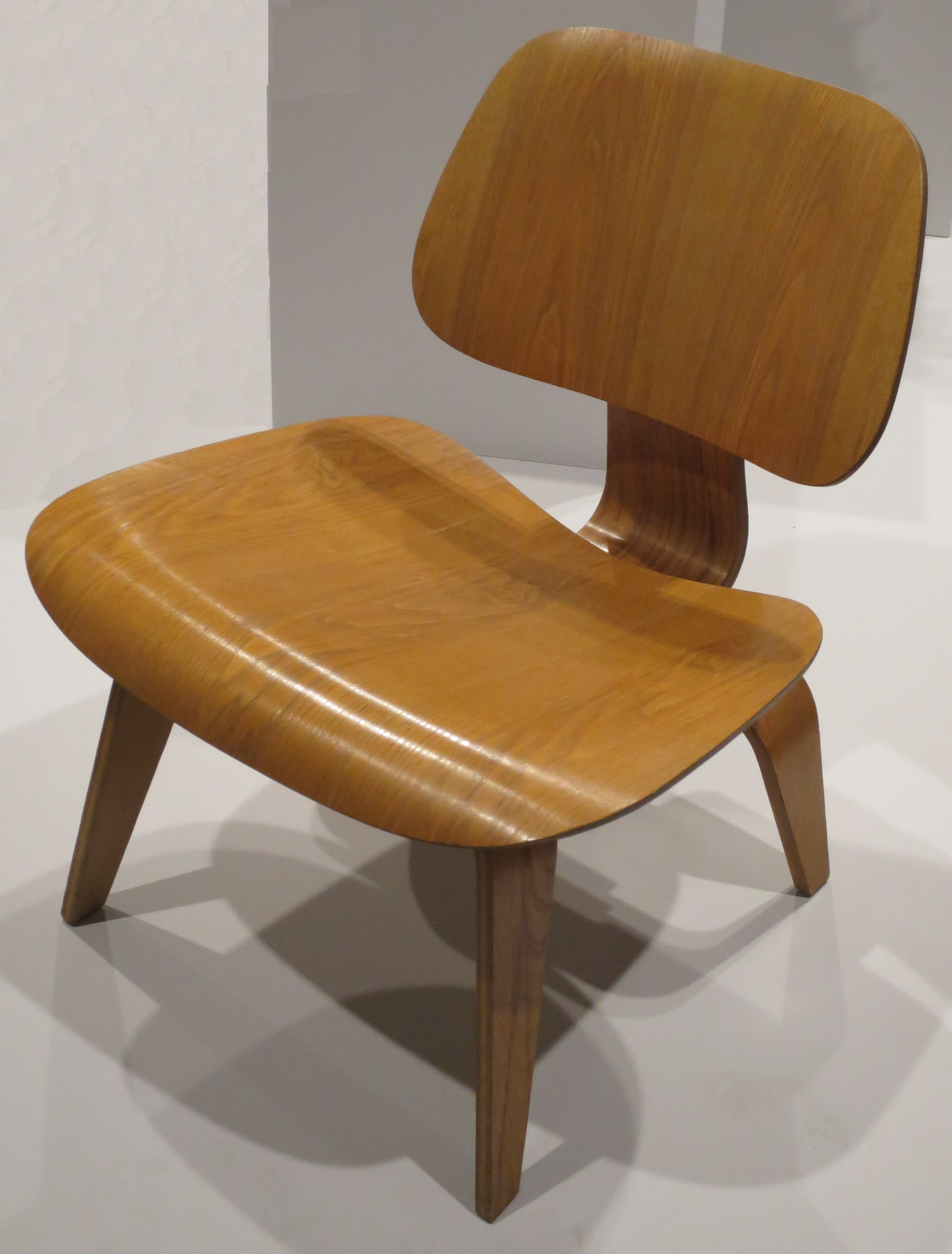
Lounge Chair Wood (LCW)

=== Popular furniture ===
Ray and Charles worked together to create their most popular furniture:

==== Lounge Chair Wood (LCW) ====
Collaborating with Eero Saarinen, the Eameses applied their knowledge of plywood, gained from their Navy splints, to chair design. The resulting Lounge Chair Wood (LCW) won the Museum of Modern Art’s Organic Designs in Home Furnishings contest and, in 1946, went into production by Herman Miller.

Time magazine called the LCW the century’s best design in its December 31, 1999, issue, writing that the designers had taken "technology [developed] to meet a wartime need (for splints) and used it to make [a chair that was] elegant, light, and comfortable. Much copied but never bettered.”

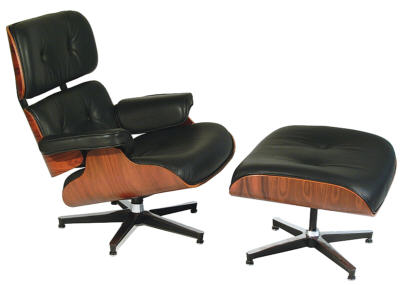
Eames Lounge Chair

==== Lounge Chair ====
In 1956, the Eameses introduced their luxurious Lounge Chair, which combined molded plywood with leather-upholstered cushioning. Charles likened the comfortable way the leather wears to a "well-used first-baseman’s mitt.” It remains in production and has become something of a status symbol.

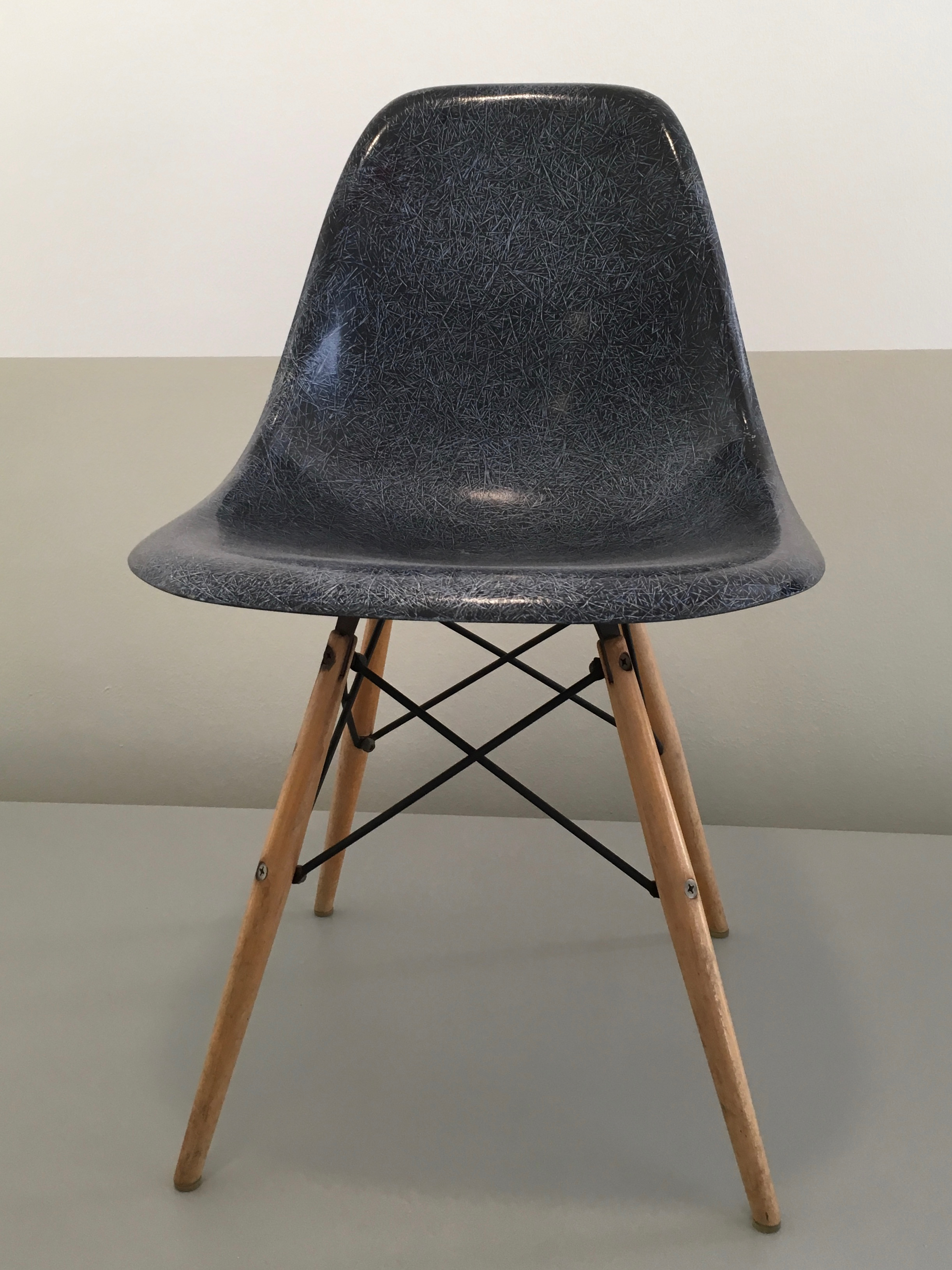
Eames Fiberglass Shell Chair

==== Shell Chair ====
Originally created in 1948 for the Museum of Modern Art’s “International Competition for Low-Cost Furniture Design,” the Eames Fiberglass Shell Chair was first sold in 1950. It was a novel creation for its time, with the entire seat made of plastic, ultimately in a range of colors, some of them vibrant.

The first shell chairs were released in three colors: Parchment, Greige, and Elephant Grey Hide. Less than a year later three more colors were added, Seafoam Green, Lemon Yellow, and Red Orange. These six colors comprised the "first generation" of Eames shell chairs, made from 1950 to 1954.

=== Films ===
Charles and Ray also created these films for the Eames Office:

- Traveling Boy (1950)
- Parade or Here They Come Down Our Street (1952)
- A Communications Primer (1953)
- Bread (1953)
- House (1955)
- Day of the Dead (1957)
- Toccata for Toy Trains (1957)
- Glimpses of the U.S.A. (1959)
- An Introduction to Feedback (1960)
- Symmetry (1961)
- Topology (1961)
- IBM at the Fair (1964)
- Aquarium (1967)
- A Computer Glossary (1968)
- Tops (1969)
- Alpha (1972)
- Computer Perspective (1972)
- SX-70 (1972)
- Powers of Ten (1977)
- Atlas (1979)

=== The Eames Office's Legacy ===
While the Eames Office is most widely known for its furniture, the design philosophy of Ray and Charles was far more holistic, and not limited to furnishings. Inventively, the scope of the work included film making, information design, and design theory. The New York Times wrote in 2015 that “by the mid-1950s, the Eameses had become as indispensable to the American computer company IBM as they were to Herman Miller,” which has continued to produce their furniture. Ray and Charles believed that design was “a way of life,” and they applied that belief to everything they did.

Furthermore, the Eames' deep appreciation for craftsmanship was fueled by research trips to India, Japan, and Mexico.

Dedicated to designing high-quality objects, Ray and Charles were “fellow workaholics.” For the armrests of Eames Lounge Chair alone, they experimented with 13 different versions before arriving at the final design.

== Later years ==
=== IBM and The 1964 World's Fair ===
With their interest in communicating ideas visually, the Eameses also turned their attention to exhibition design, beginning in 1950, for the Chicago Merchandise Mart and the New York Museum of Modern Art, and continuing into the mid-1970s, for IBM.

As ongoing consultants to IBM, Charles and Ray developed a special relationship with the company that involved not only the creation of films, presentations, and educational products, but also Charles and Ray's insights for the future of the company.

During the 1960s and early 1970s, the Eameses designed a series of exhibitions for IBM, centered on scientific and mathematical themes, as well as famous individuals within those fields. If Ray was less passionate about computers than her husband, she shared his belief in their importance and used her talents to make them understandable and acceptable to ordinary people. In 1961, the IBM Corporation commissioned the Eameses to create Mathematica: A World of Numbers and Beyond, presenting mathematical concepts in a pleasurable way.

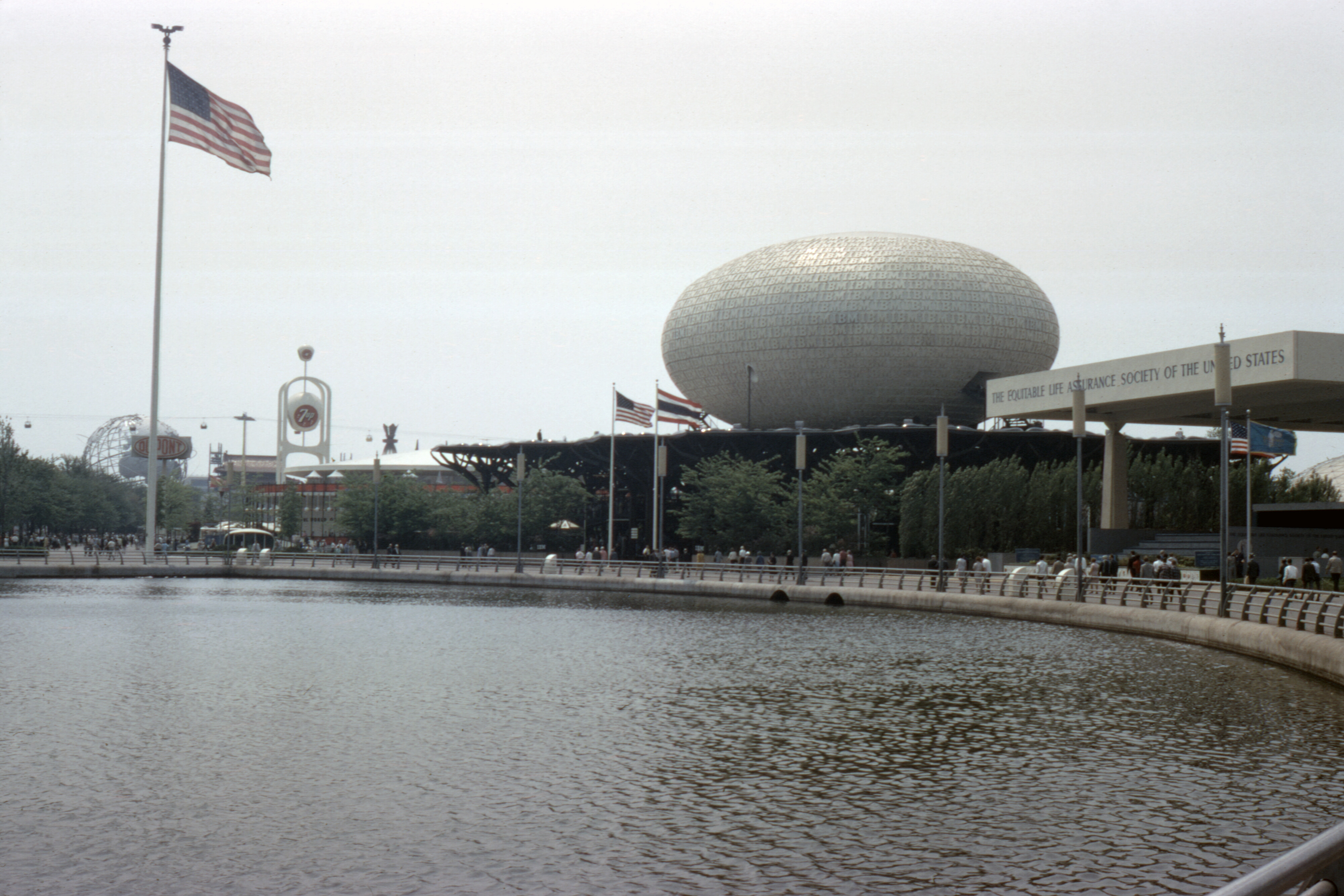
1964 World's Fair IBM Pavilion

Mathematica's success gave the Eameses confidence to continue using exhibitions to explore complex themes, and the prestige it brought IBM led that corporation to commission a pavilion and an exhibition for the New York World's Fair of 1964. For this project, Charles and Ray immediately entered into discussions on this project with Eero Saarinen. The result was a 1.25-acre site divided into several distinct exhibition areas, each covered with an enormous translucent plastic canopy held up by steel "trees." Some designers and critics, considered it somewhat excessive and vulgar and felt that the Eameses had gone too far in their popularizing science, technology, and "the modern." The general public, however, appeared to have loved it.

=== Other work ===
The Eames Office's productivity slowed after Charles died, in August 1978. Ray worked on several unfinished projects (e.g. a German version of the Mathematica exhibition), continued consulting to IBM, published books, gave lectures, accepted awards, and administered the Eames archive and estate. She organized and donated approximately 1.5 million two-dimensional objects to the Library of Congress for archival safekeeping. Featuring all Eames Office projects from 1941 until the mid-80s, she authored a book—although much of it was altered before publication, just after her death. In the years prior to her death, Ray hosted visiting groups of 50 to 60 students, and was planning to host 100 members of the American Institute of Architects, to view the house and picnic in the meadow.

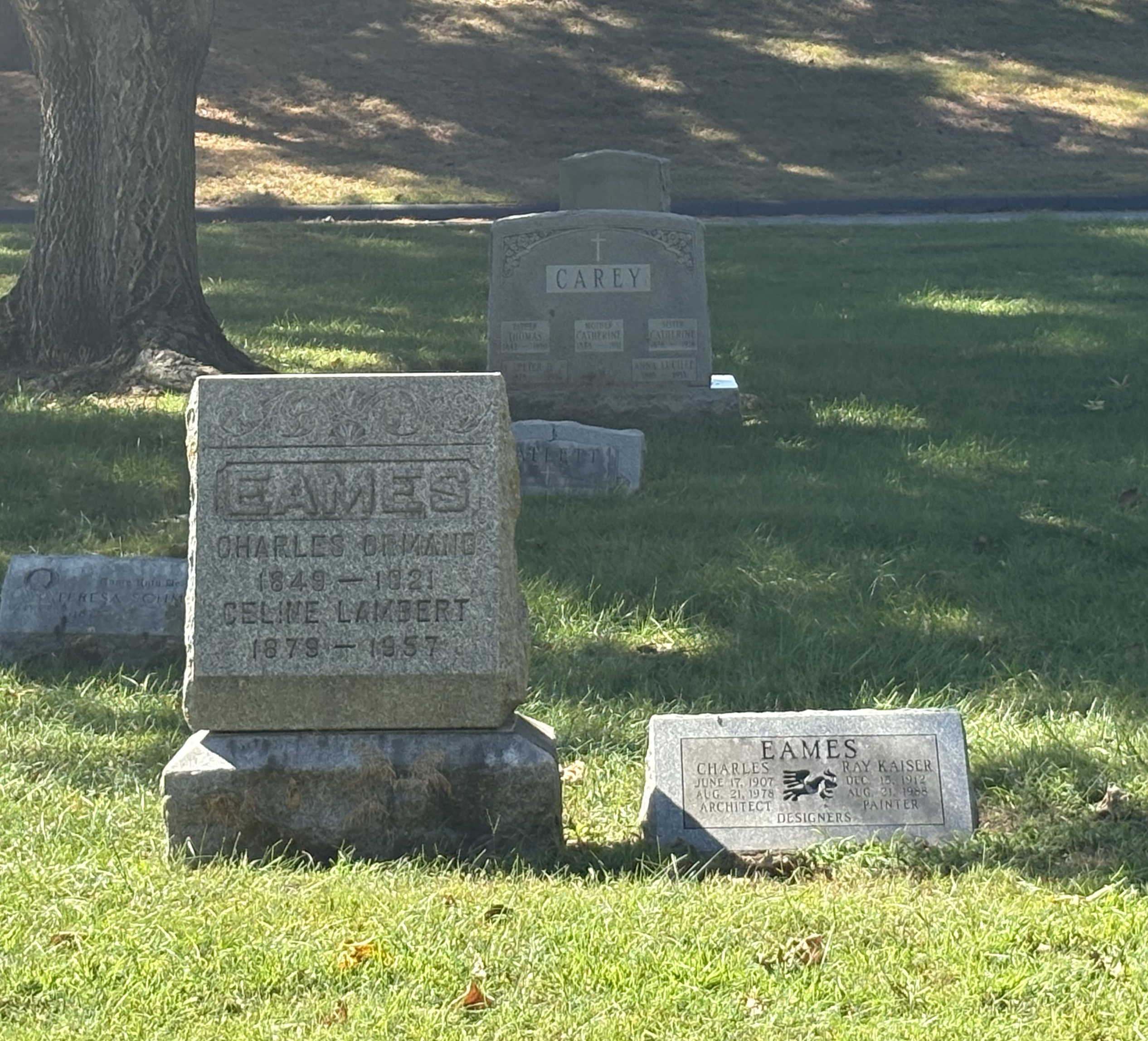
Graves of Ray and Charles Eames (smaller stone at right) at Calvary Cemetery

=== Death ===
Ray died in Cedars Sinai Hospital, Los Angeles, California, on August 21, 1988, 10 years to the day after Charles. They are buried beside each other in Calvary Cemetery in St. Louis, Missouri. The Office closed after her death.

=== Legacy ===
To honor what would have been Ray's 100th birthday, Vitra renamed a street at its Basel Campus "Ray-Eames-Strasse 1."

On February 23, 2013, a 3,300-square-foot exhibition entitled “Ray Eames: A Century of Modern Design,” opened in the Sacramento, California Museum. The show ran for one year and featured work she produced before meeting Charles, in 1941, in addition to the work of the Eames Office.

Ray, along with Charles, had also produced the India Report, creating a basis for the government of India's National Institute of Design, in Ahmedabad.

==== Recognition ====
Ray's contributions to the work of the Eames Office were overlooked during her lifetime, with Ray often portrayed as an insignificant part of the Office. When the Eameses appeared on The Today Show in 1956, for example, the new lounge chair was presented simply as “designed by Charles Eames.” The show's host, Arlene Francis, added that “when there is a very successful man, there is an interesting and able woman behind him.” Francis proceeded to introduce Ray condescendingly, with the line, “This is Mrs. Eames, and she’s going to tell us how she helps Charles.” In general, the media typically attributed the work solely to Charles, sometimes footnoting Ray.

In recent decades, however, Ray's work has received more attention. In 1990, the journal Furniture History published a thorough interview between design historian Pat Kirkham and Ray. As Kirkham put it in the introduction to the interview transcript, "the interchange of ideas between these two enormously talented individuals is particularly difficult to chart because their personal and design relationship was so close." Although Charles did not correct Arlene Francis, he often stated that Ray's role was essential to the work the two did together.

Ray has also received posthumous recognition for her personal fashion sense, which the New York Times described as "too maidenly to be echt-bohemian, too saucy to be quaint."

==== Awards ====
- 100th Anniversary Gold Medal (craftsmanship and excellence in furniture design and execution): American Institute of Architects (AIA), with Charles Eames, 1957
- Emmy Award (Graphics), "The Fabulous Fifties", with Charles Eames, 1960
- Kaufmann International Design Award, with Charles Eames, 1961
- Women of the Year 1977: California Museum of Science & Industry Muses, Los Angeles, 1977
- Gold Medal: American Institute of Graphic Artists (AIGA), with Charles Eames, 1977
- 25 Year Award: American Institute of Architects (AIA), with Charles Eames, 1978
- Gold Medal: Royal Institute of British Architects (RIBA), with Charles Eames, London, 1979
- U.S. Postal Service Stamps, Charles and Ray Eames, 2008

== Philosophy ==
Anything I can do, Ray can do better.

— Charles Eames

I never gave up painting, I just changed my palette.

— Ray Eames

== See also ==
- National Institute of Design
- The India Report
