= Botteghe Oscure =

Italian literary periodical

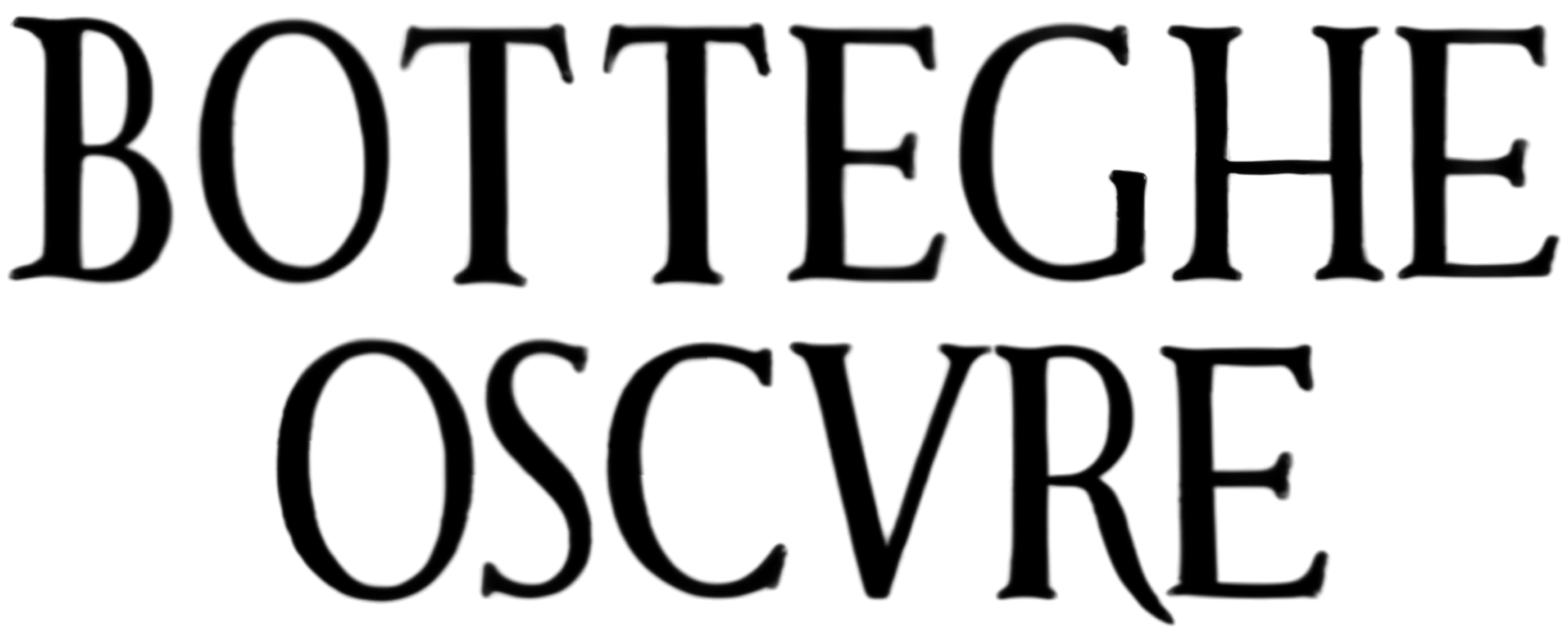
- Categories: literary journal
- Founder: Marguerite Caetani
- Founded: 1948
- Final issue: 1960
- Country: Italy
- Based in: Rome
- Language: Italian, French, English, German, Spanish
- OCLC: 1536926

Botteghe Oscure was a literary journal that was founded and edited in Rome by Marguerite Caetani (Princess di Bassiano) from 1948 to 1960.

== History and profile ==
Botteghe Oscure was established in 1948. The magazine was named after Rome's via delle Botteghe Oscure (Latin: Ad Apothecas Obscuras), where the editorial office was located; during the Middle Ages the street's "dark shops" came to be installed under the dark arches of the Circus Flaminius.

The review was published twice a year with poetry and prose in five languages (Italian, French and English, and alternating issues featuring German and Spanish-language segments. It was distributed in the United States through Farrar, Straus & Young and the Gotham Book Mart.

Giorgio Bassani was an editor. Later Eugene Walter moved from Paris to Rome to edit the magazine for Caetani. The publication of the magazine ended in 1960.

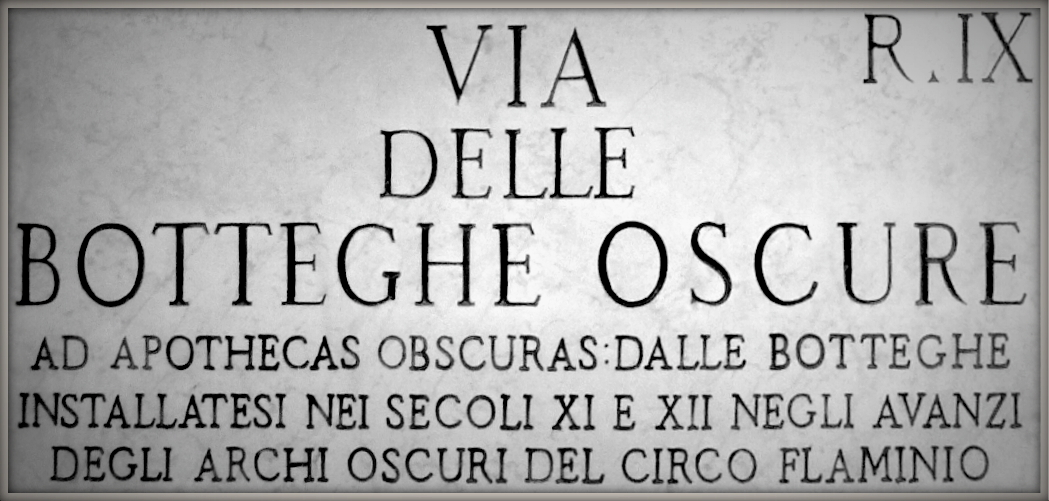

In 1951 the journal published the poem "Do not go gentle into that good night" by Welsh poet Dylan Thomas.

== See also ==
- List of magazines in Italy
