= Cornelia Van Auken Chapin =

American sculptor

- Born: August 7, 1893; Waterford, Connecticut, US
- Died: December 4, 1972 (aged 79); Lakeville, Connecticut, US
- Partner: Marion Sanford
- Relatives: Katherine Garrison Chapin (sister); Marguerite Caetani (half-sister); Schuyler Chapin (nephew)

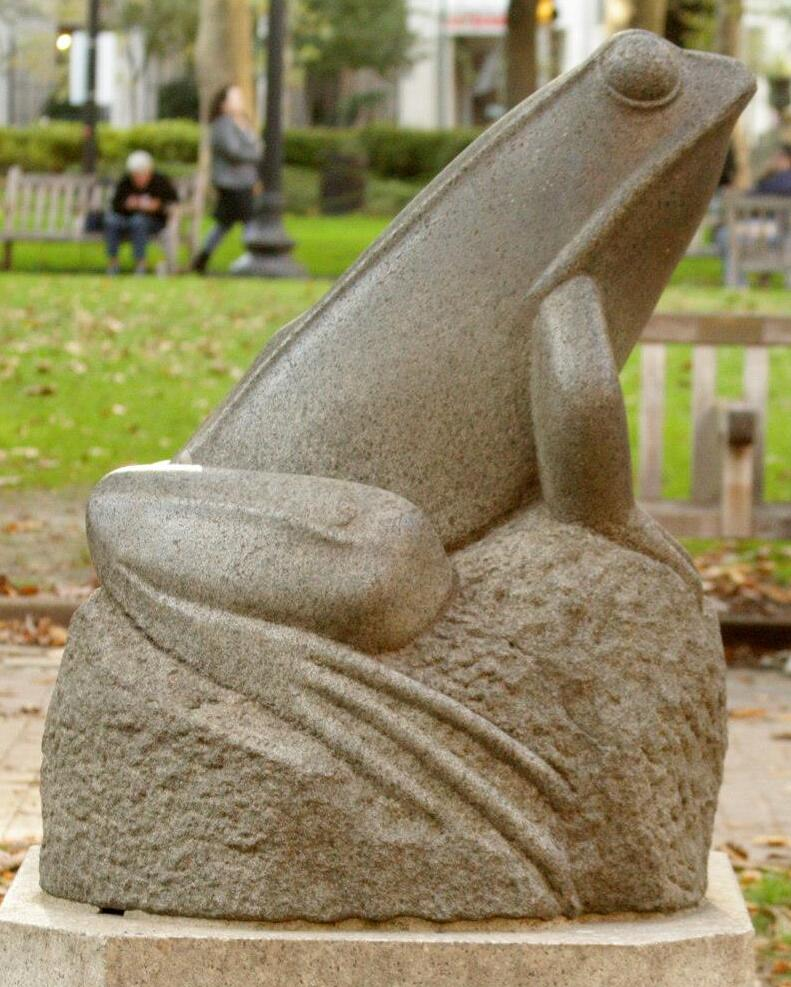
Frog by Chapin, Rittenhouse Square, Philadelphia

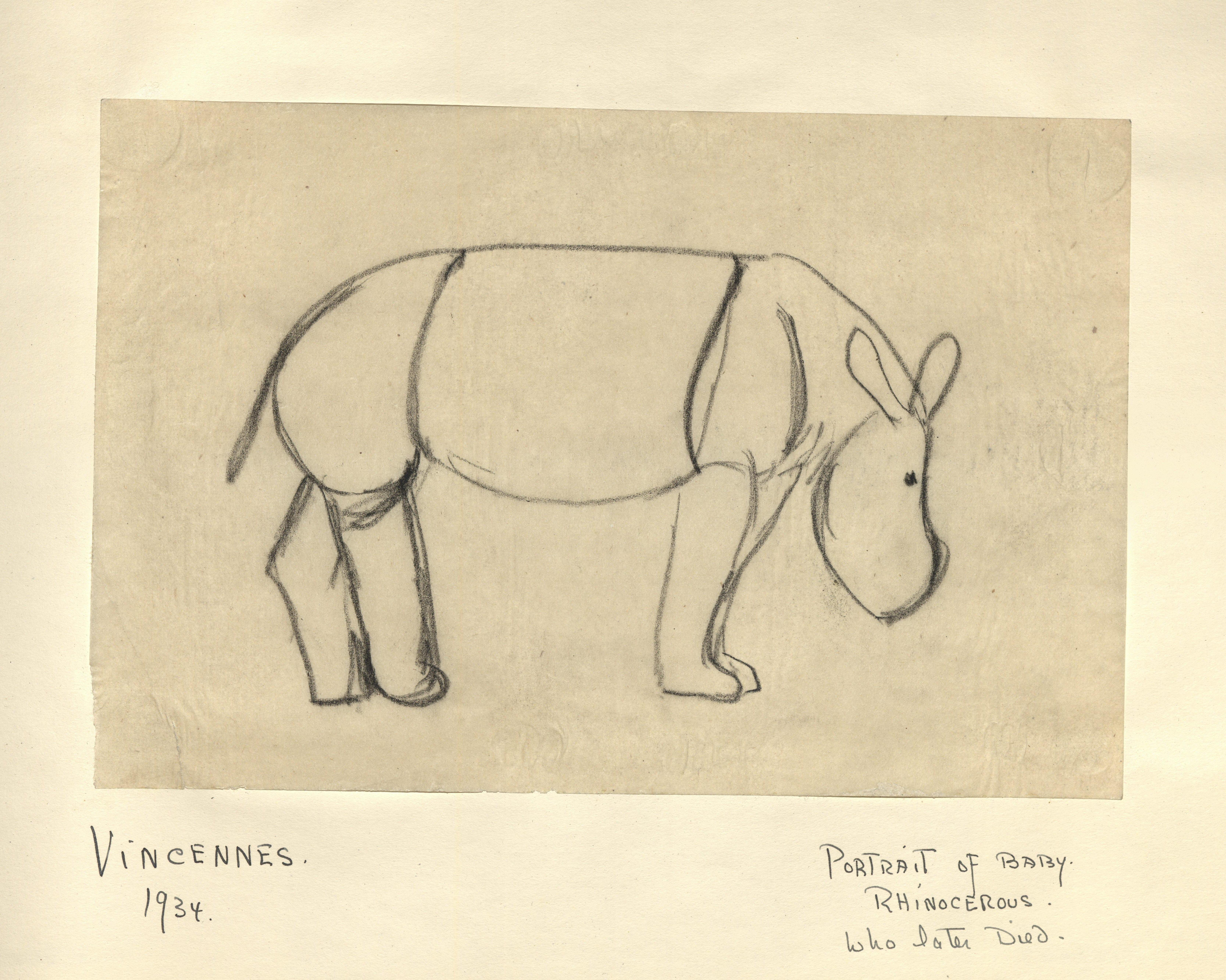
Drawing by Chapin (1934)

Cornelia Van Auken Chapin (August 7, 1893 – December 4, 1972) was an American sculptor and animalier born in Waterford, Connecticut. She was known for her stone models of birds and animals, which she largely carved directly from life and without preliminary models or sketches.

== Early life ==
Cornelia Chapin was born in Connecticut and raised in New York City as part of a prominent socialite family. Daughter of Lindley Hoffman Chapin (1854–1896), a Manhattan lawyer and Cornelia Garrison (Van Auken) Chapin (1865–1925), an actress, Cornelia Chapin was also a descendant of Supreme Court Justice George P. Andrews (who presided in the trials of former slave traders) and Cornelius K. Garrison (a merchant involved with the building of railroads). Chapin was also sister to poet Katherine Garrison Chapin Biddle, whose husband Francis Biddle was the 58th United States Attorney General. Chapin's nephew was Schuyler Chapin, General Manager of the Metropolitan Opera and Commissioner of Cultural Affairs for New York City under Mayor Rudy Giuliani. Her older paternal half-sister was the publisher Marguerite Caetani.

== Sculpture ==
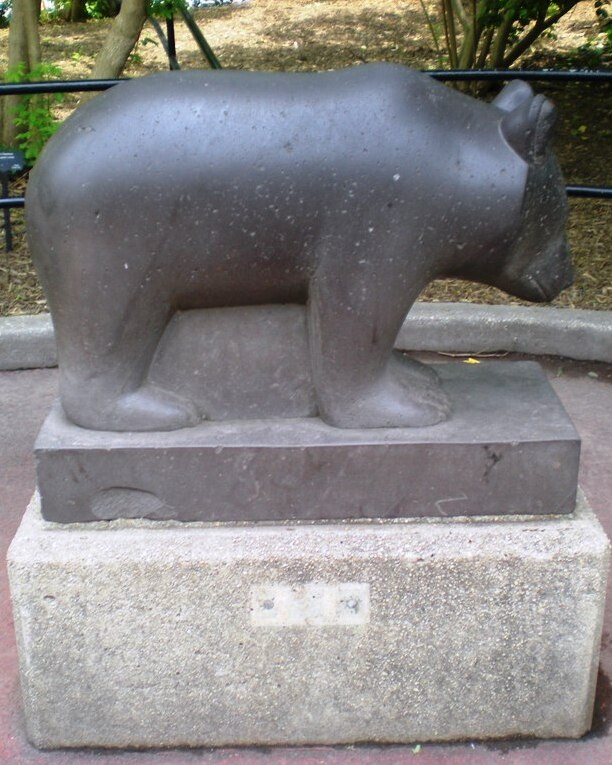
Bear by Chapin, National Zoological Park, Washington, D.C.

Cornelia Chapin developed an interest in art as a young child – dabbling in pencil sketches and watercolors - but by the early 1920s, she settled on sculpture as her main interest. Chapin studied under Gail Sherman Corbett and later shared studios with both Genevieve Karr Hamlin and Marion Sanford.

She early became interested in creating somewhat abstracted animal forms and in the early 1934 moved to Paris to study direct carving with Mateo Hernandez (1884–1949), from whom she learned the art of direct carving. She would go to the zoo and carve sculptures of animals, an unusual technique for direct carvers.

In 1936, following the success of her carving Tortoise she was elected a member of the Salon d'Automne, the only foreigner and the only woman thus honored that year.

She returned to the United States following the start of World War II and shared a studio, that had formerly belonged the Gutzon Borglum, with Sanford. In the summer of 1949 she was one of 250 sculptors who exhibited in the 3rd Sculpture International held at the Philadelphia Museum of Art. From 1951 to 1953 Chapin served on the New York City Art Commission.

Chapin was most famous for her sculptures of birds and animals, though she also sculpted human figures. Between 1930 and the early 1960s, Chapin exhibited in galleries in New York, Connecticut, Pennsylvania, California, Washington, D.C., New Jersey, Maine, and Paris, and won numerous awards and prizes for her work during the 1930s and 1940s. These included the 2nd Grand Prize at the 1937 Paris International Exposition for her sculptures "Pelican in Repose" and "Tortoise in Volcanic Rock," the Sculpture Prize from the Asbury Park Fine Arts Society in 1939, and an Honorable Mention from the Allied Artists of America in 1941 for her sculpture "Paquita the Bear." She also lectured on the art of direct carving in museums and schools. Chapin was a member of the National Academy of Design, the National Sculpture Society, and the only foreign and only woman sculptor elected to the Societaire Salon d'Automne, in 1936.

Chapin was a founding member of the Sculptors Guild and also a member in the National Sculpture Society and the National Academy of Design.

Cornelia Chapin sculptures are represented in the National Zoological Park in Washington, D.C., and in Rittenhouse Square in Philadelphia, Pennsylvania, among other locations.

== Personal life ==
In her later years, Chapin lived and worked with Marion Sanford in Lakeville, Connecticut. Cornelia Chapin died in Connecticut in 1972.

== Selected works ==
- Reigning Christ, Triumphant, The Great Cross, above the High Altar, Cathedral of St. John the Divine, New York City
