= The India Report =

1958 report for the Government of India

The India Report was prepared by Charles Eames and Ray Eames in 1958.

The Government of India had asked for recommendations on a programme of training in design that would serve as an aid to the small industries; and that would resist the present rapid deterioration in design and quality of consumer goods. Charles Eames, American industrial designer and his wife and colleague Ray Eames, visited India for three months at the invitation of the Government, with the sponsorship of the Ford Foundation, to explore the problems of design and to make recommendations for a training programme. The Eameses toured throughout India, making a careful study of the many centres of design, handicrafts and general manufacture. They talked with many persons, official and non-official, in the field of small and large industry, in design and architecture, and in education. The report emerged as a result of their study and discussions. It stipulated the underlying spirit needed to promote a suitable national design outlook and advocated the setting up of an indigenous design legacy that involved applications of modern disciplines and old traditions to meet the challenges of contemporary India.

Following the report, the Government set up the National Institute of Design in 1961 as an autonomous national institution for research, service and training in Industrial Design and Visual Communication.

== What can we learn from this report ==
The report highlighted the importance of conscious decision-making, conscious selection, and correction concerning evolving needs in a communication-oriented society. It also emphasized India's advantages in facing the rapid changes taking place, including its familiarity with the concept of creative destruction, the opportunity to learn from the mistakes of others, and the well-defined immediate problems of food, shelter, distribution, and population.

The Eames India Report also discussed the design process, using the example of the Lota, a simple vessel of everyday use in India. It highlighted the various factors that would need to be considered in designing a Lota, such as the amount of liquid to be carried, the size and strength of the hands using it, transportation methods, balance, fluid dynamics, sculpture, opening size, texture, heat transfer, and more.

It emphasized the need for conscious decision-making and a focus on evolving needs in a changing society.

== What are the actionable items for the Design in India to grow ==
1. Conduct a sober investigation into the values and qualities important to a good life in India.
2. Restudy the problems of environment and shelter.
3. Scrutinize the elements that make up a "Standard of Living" in India.
4. Restate solutions to problems in theory and in actual prototype.
5. Explore the evolving symbols of India.
6. Establish an institute of design, research, and service connected with the Ministry of Commerce and Industry.
7. Create a Board of Governors drawn from various disciplines to oversee the institute.
8. Develop a program of training in design for small industries.
9. Emphasize the importance of conscious decision-making and conscious selection and correction in relation to evolving needs.
10. Encourage interdisciplinary collaboration and bring together disciplines such as sociology, engineering, philosophy, architecture, economics, communications, physics, psychology, history, painting, and anthropology.
11. Focus on the immediate problems of food, shelter, distribution, and population in India.
12. Design products and services that consider factors such as usability, transportation methods, balance, fluid dynamics, sculpture, opening size, texture, heat transfer, and more.
13. Foster a questioning approach and a concern for quality in design.
14. Communicate research findings and results effectively through exhibitions, graphics, printing, photography, film, demonstration, writing, and drama.
15. Encourage staff and students to stick their necks out and take risks in their work.
16. Provide training through participation in research and service projects, as well as exposure to specific disciplines.

These actionable items provide a roadmap for addressing the problems of design and quality in India and establishing an institute that can contribute to the improvement of consumer goods and the overall standard of living in the country.
