= Lynching of Cleo Wright =

1942 lynching of an African American in the US

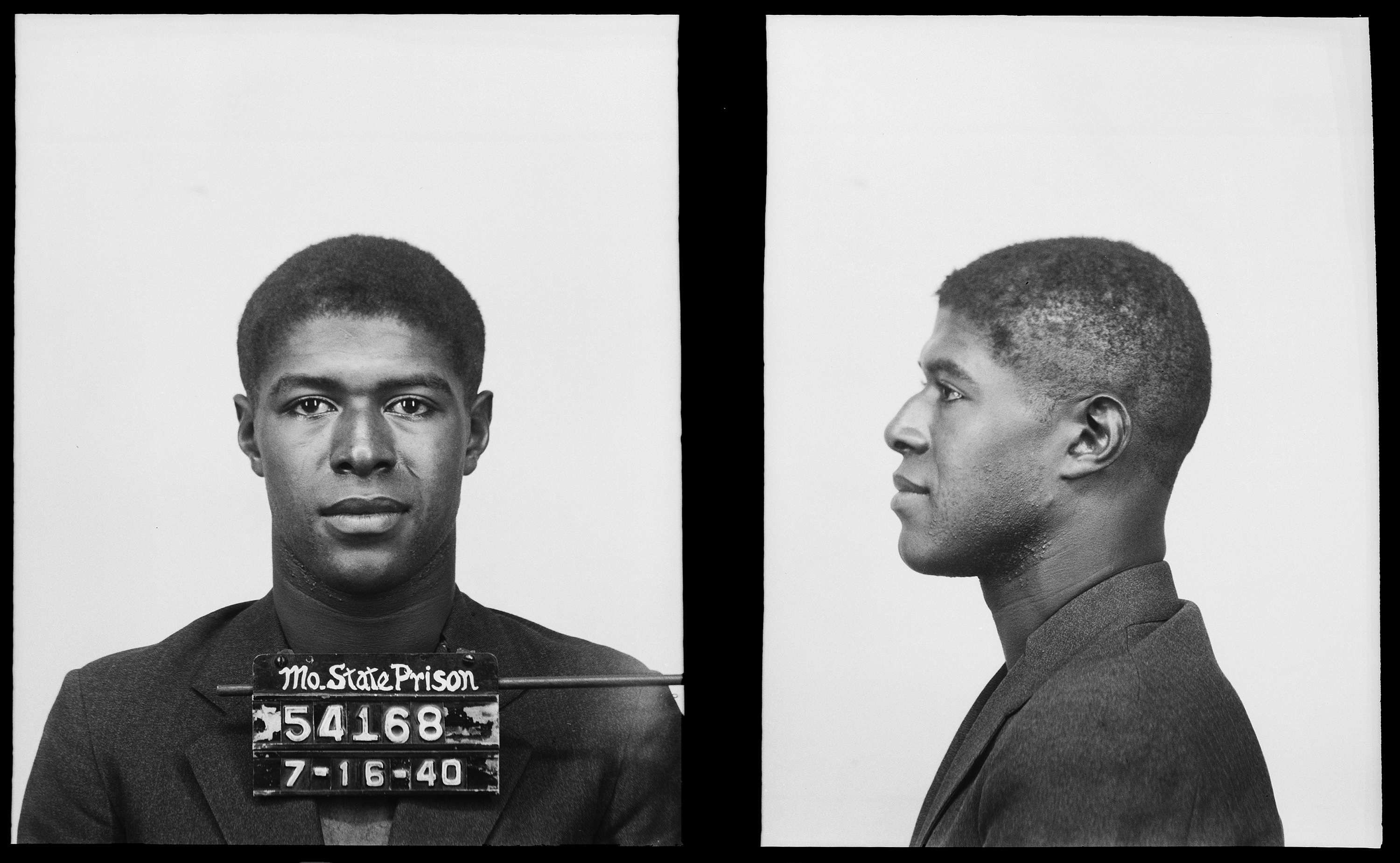
July 1940 mugshot of Cleo Wright

Cleo Wright was a 26-year-old African-American cotton mill worker who was lynched in Sikeston, Missouri, during the afternoon of January 25, 1942. He was accused of attacking a white woman with a knife and attempting to sexually assault her, and subsequently resisted arrest by stabbing a police officer in the face. After being shot four times and bludgeoned by police, Wright was refused sufficient medical care on the basis of his race. He then was taken from his holding cell in the Sikeston City Hall by a white mob, dragged by a car to the predominantly African-American neighborhood of Sunset Addition, and burned alive in view of two church congregations.

The lynching of Wright was the first lynching to occur after the United States' entry into World War II, and led to the first ever federal investigation into a civil rights case.

== Background ==
Cleo Wright, born Ricelor Cleodas Watson on June 16, 1916, was an African-American man from Pine Bluff, Arkansas who was employed in Sikeston's booming cotton economy. Wright briefly joined the Navy, but left dissatisfied in 1936 after missing a family funeral and experiencing disrespect from white superiors. He was a known petty thief. Shortly before his lynching, Wright was generally well-liked in Sikeston among white and black residents. He was newly married to Ardella Wright, who was pregnant with their first child.

On Sunday, January 25, 1942, at 1:00AM in Sikeston, Missouri, a black man entered the home of a white woman, Grace Sturgeon. The assailant, surprised by Sturgeon's physical resistance, slashed Sturgeon's abdomen. The assailant then fled the scene after being alarmed by the presence of Sturgeon's sister-in-law, Laverne, and frightened by the sudden noise of a passing automobile. Sturgeon survived the assault, but never managed to positively identify a perpetrator.

A search immediately began for the assailant. Thirty minutes following the assault, Cleo Wright was found calmly walking over a mile away by a neighbor of Sturgeon, Jesse Whittley, and Night Marshall Hess Perrigan. Wright had a bloodied long knife in his pants that was soon confiscated. Wright claimed that the blood had been from a fight with other black men. Wright resisted the subsequent arrest, and was bludgeoned with a revolver and a flashlight by Night Marshall Hess Perrigan. After Perrigan joined Wright in the back seat of the patrol car, an altercation ensued in the vehicle where Wright procured a hidden scout knife and stabbed Perrigan in the face, crushing several teeth and cutting through his tongue. Perrigan then shot Wright four times with a .45 Auto revolver.

Communicating through phone calls, white residents of Sikeston rapidly learned of the assault on Sturgeon and Perrigan. Rumors affirmed the belief in white residents that the assailant was undoubtedly Cleo Wright, and that the assailant had intended to rape Grace Sturgeon in her home.

Grace Sturgeon and Hess Perrigan were quickly admitted to the General Hospital. Wright was briefly held at the City Hall, and then was sent to the General Hospital for surgery upon the rediscovery of his gunshot wounds, broken arm, and battered head. Wright received minimal care without anesthetic, as the hospital was whites-only. He was observed to be near death at 6:30AM. Wright was unable to recognize his wife while admitted. Wright was taken by ambulance back to his home in Sikeston, but Wright's in-laws raised concerns about being unable to care for him. At 9:30AM, he was then transported to the Sikeston City Hall's jail and placed in a women's detention room that was believed to be more comfortable for the dying Wright. An unknown person attempted to ease Wright's pain by giving him a large quantity of whiskey.

== Lynching ==
At 11:35AM, a white mob of 700 people gathered around the Sikeston City Hall. The mob overpowered the police force, grabbed the unconscious Wright from the female holding cell in the Sikeston City Hall and dragged Wright behind a stolen maroon Ford sedan for several blocks. White onlookers celebrated the procession. The lynchers stopped upon reaching the Sunset Addition, the historic black neighborhood of Sikeston, by the railroad easement at Maude in view of the First Baptist Church and Smith Chapel. A middle-aged lyncher poured five gallons of gasoline on Wright, now nude from the dragging. A younger and inebriated lyncher was unsuccessful at igniting Wright, and another lyncher lit a match to burn Wright alive in front of Smith Chapel's black congregation during its Sunday services.

== Aftermath ==
Cleo Wright's remains were transported by a dump truck to the potter's field of Carpenter Cemetery. Threats were made to other black residents of Sikeston, and nearly 100 residents fled and never returned to the community. Others armed themselves and guarded the entrance to the Sunset Addition. Governor Forrest Donnell directed the Missouri State Highway Patrol and Sheriff John Hobbs to assign additional men to deescalate the white mobs. Afterwards, black residents who had armed themselves and patrolled the community opened a chapter of the NAACP, seeking protection from mob violence. The white community considered the killing justified. Church leaders, while generally negative on the righteousness of lynching, were afraid to speak out one way or the other due to the fear it would drive "a wedge" between members. The NAACP in St. Louis, Missouri held a mass rally of 3,500 people and an excess of 2,000 more attendees on February 1 in response to the lynching, calling for prosecution of the lynchers and a federal anti-lynching law. Arthur Wergs Mitchell, then the only African American in the U.S. Congress, urged President Roosevelt to "speak out in condemnation of the Missouri terrorists."

=== Investigation ===
The lynching of Cleo Wright was the first lynching to occur in the United States since the December 1941 attack on Pearl Harbor. The sensitivity of domestic issues during the war, coupled with increased pressure from a strong NAACP and activists in St. Louis, led to an unprecedented federal investigation into the lynching. On February 10, Francis Biddle requested the Federal Bureau of Investigation to probe into the lynching upon finding that Wright's death was exploited in Japanese wartime propaganda. Biddle was especially concerned for the morale of Black Americans during the war. Extensive documentation was gathered from police and Sikeston residents on the identities, actions, employment, and even churchgoing status of the 20 named lynchers. No indictments were ultimately made because the selected all-white grand jury sympathized with the lynchers, and the lack of an anti-lynching law led to a weaker charge of conspiracy to violate Wright's constitutional rights. This Department of Justice strategy would later be adapted with initial success in the prosecution of the police lynching of Robert Hall by the Baker County, Georgia sheriff Claude Screws, though the conviction was overturned in the Supreme Court case Screws v. United States.

=== Legacy ===
Following the lynching, a pervasive culture of silence obstructed community acknowledgement of the events. In January 2022, 80 years after the lynching of Cleo Wright, a memorial service was held in Sikeston in remembrance and reconciliation of community trauma. In June 2022, a commemorative soil collection ceremony attended by a descendant of Wright was held by the Equal Justice Initiative.

In 2024, KFF Health News and Retro Report produced a documentary and 4-part podcast series titled Silence in Sikeston. The coverage addressed the history of racial violence in Sikeston, profiling the lynching of Cleo Wright and the 2020 police killing of Denzel Taylor. Podcast episodes focused on the health effects of racial trauma and minority stress.

== See also ==
- Lynching in the United States
