= John of Ferentino =

Italian notary, curialist and cardinal

John of Ferentino, in Italian Giovanni da Ferentino (c. 1150 – 1217), was an Italian notary, curialist and cardinal of the Catholic Church. He served as the cardinal deacon of Santa Maria in Via Lata from 1204 until 1212 and then as the cardinal priest of Santa Prassede until his death. He served as an apostolic legate to England in 1206 and as rector of the Papal States in Campania in 1217.

== Early life ==
John was born in Ferentino in central Italy around the middle of the 12th century. He is first mentioned in a document from the Papal curia dated 23 March 1203. There are, however, several earlier references to persons named John that may refer to John of Ferentino.

The Annales Ceccanenses report the presence of a Iohannes Ferentinus with the title of magister at the consecration of the church of Santa Maria a Fiume in 1196. Between 5 and 10 April 1198, the Novarese judge Giacomo Sicco sent several letters to a notary and subdeacon named John. In 1199, Pope Innocent III conferred the archidiaconate of the cathedral of Padua on a certain John, described as a notary, subdeacon and magister. It is not known whether these three references are all to the same person or whether any of them was the future cardinal.

== Cardinal deacon of Santa Maria in Vita Lata ==
From his first appearance in the Papal curia on 23 March 1203 until 25 December 1204, John, as notary and subdeacon, drafted the pope's correspondence. In this role, he replaced Biagio, who had been elected archbishop of Torres. Probably in late December, Innocent III appointed John cardinal deacon of Santa Maria in Via Lata. It was as a cardinal deacon that he continued to draft the pope's correspondence between 9 January and 5 December 1205. He was succeeded by Cardinal Giovanni dei Conti di Segni, who was the first holder of the position to bear the title Chancellor of the Holy Roman Church.

On 1 February 1206, John was named legate to England. On 11 June, Innocent III charged him with investigating the reasonableness of the request by the prior and canons of St Petroc's in Bodmin to be elevated into an abbey. The date of his arrival in England is unknown. He was still in Italy as late as 22 June. His legation dealt with the rights of the church against the monarch, King John, and relations between monasteries and the secular church. In England, John visited St Augustine's Abbey, Evesham Abbey, Ramsey Abbey and in August 1206 St Mary's Abbey, York. During his time in England, he also heard cases involving Harrold Priory and Beaulieu Abbey. He held a synod at Reading in October 1206. The nature of this synod is obscure, but the Brut y Tywysogion says that there John "confirmed the church law throughout the whole kingdom". Contemporary chronicles criticise the expenses his legation incurred as outlandish. Roger of Wendover accuses him of raising money all over England and returning to Rome with it. Six of John's acts as legate survive and two documents drawn up on his behalf but not actually issued by him.

On his return journey through France, John sought to bring about a reconciliation between King John and King Philip II of France following the French conquest of Normandy. He also tried to convince Philip to take back his wife, Ingeborg. His was back in Rome by 9 January 1207, when as Papal auditor he heard a case involving the archidiaconate of Antioch. On 8 October 1208, he attended the ceremony of investiture of Innocent III's brother Riccardo with the county of Sora in the episcopal palace of the diocese of Ferentino. His presence at the curia can be traced regularly through May 1212.

== Cardinal priest of Santa Prassede ==
Later in 1212, Innocent III promoted John cardinal priest of Santa Prassede. This has led to some confusion, since his successor, Giovanni Colonna, had the same name. On 30 December 1214, John was appointed legate and apostolic vicar in matters both spiritual and temporal in the Marche, which the pope claimed as part of the Papal State. In 1215, he attended the Fourth Lateran Council. He signed a papal privilege on 4 December 1215 for the last time. Nevertheless, he continued to play an active role in the pontificate of Innocent's successor, Honorius III.

On 5–6 March 1217, Honorius named John as rector of Papal lands in Campania. This required him to both govern the lands and defend them from threats from the Kingdom of Sicily. In this capacity, he reformed the priory of Sant'Agnello in Guarcino, which was confirmed by Honorius III in a document dated 26 May. This document is important as the only source to refer explicitly to John's succession of cardinalates. It refers to John as "of good memory", and his death must have taken place in late March or early April. Giovanni Colonna was cardinal of Santa Prassede by 21 April.

== Bibliography ==
- Cheney, C. R. (1931). "The Papal Legate and English Monasteries in 1206". The English Historical Review. 46 (183): 443–452. JSTOR 552676.
- Cheney, C. R. (1961). "Cardinal John of Ferentino, Papal Legate in England in 1206". The English Historical Review. 76 (301): 654–660. doi:10.1093/ehr/LXXVI.CCCI.654. JSTOR 558202.
- Gaffuri, Laura (2001). "Giovanni da Ferentino". Dizionario Biografico degli Italiani (in Italian). Vol. 56: Giovanni Di Crescenzio–Giulietti. Rome: Istituto dell'Enciclopedia Italiana. ISBN 978-88-12-00032-6.
