= Ceccano =

- Comune
- Comune di Ceccano
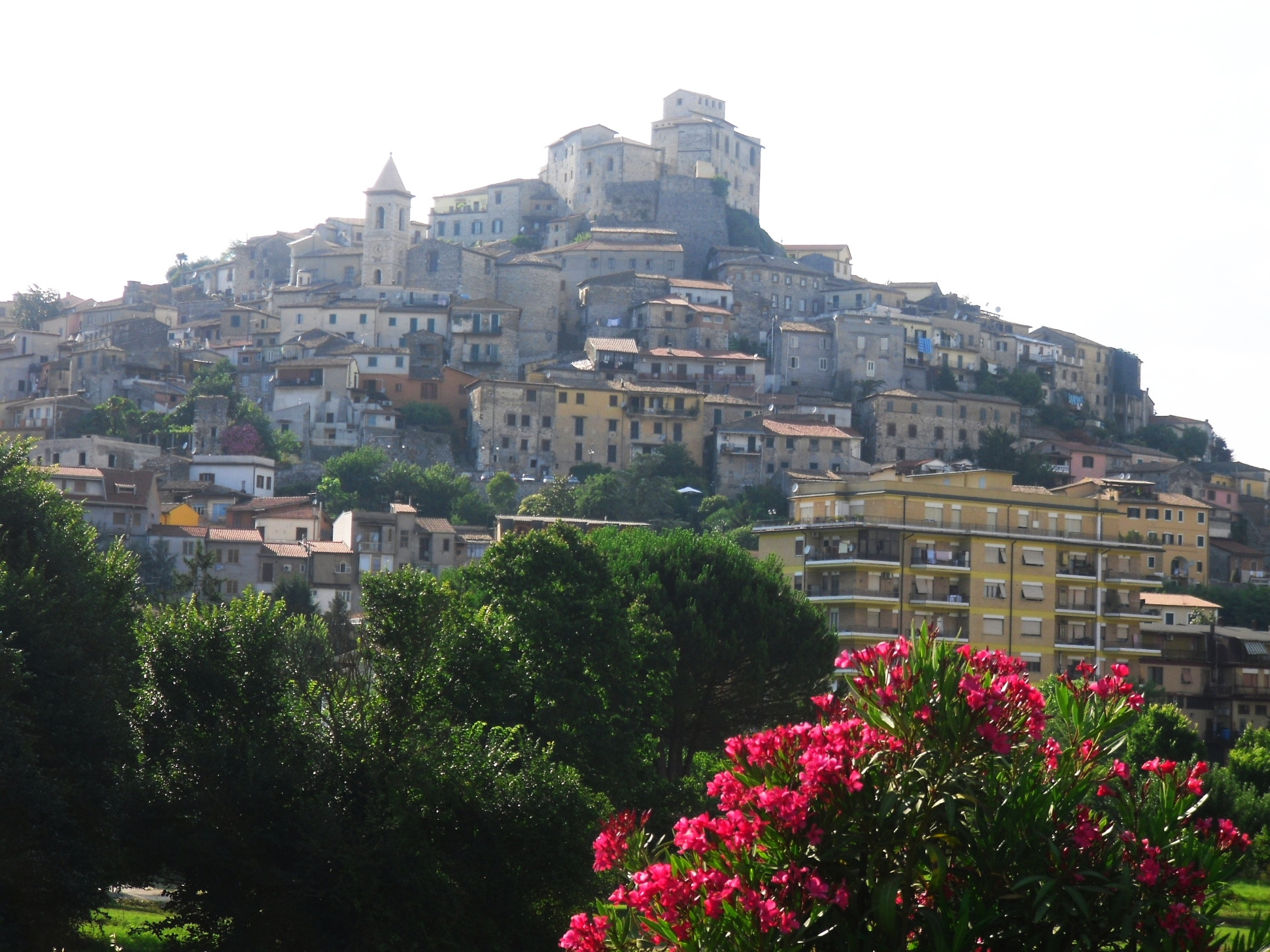
- View of Ceccano

- Location within Italy Location within Lazio
- Coordinates: 41°34′N 13°20′E
- Country: Italy
- Region: Lazio
- Province: Frosinone (FR)

Government
  - Mayor: Roberto Caligiore

Area
  - Total: 61.06 km^{2} (23.58 sq mi)
- Elevation: 200 m (660 ft)

Population (31 October 2020)
  - Total: 22,367
  - Density: 366.3/km^{2} (948.7/sq mi)
- Demonym: Ceccanesi
- Time zone: UTC+1 (CET)
  - Summer (DST): UTC+2 (CEST)
- Postal code: 03023
- Dialing code: 0775
- Patron saint: St. John the Baptist
- Saint day: 24 June
- Website: Official website

Ceccano is a town and comune in the province of Frosinone, Lazio, central Italy, in the Latin Valley.

== History ==
The town had its origins as an ancient Volscian citadel that surrendered to the Romans in 330 BC (424 Ab Urbe Condita). Its name in ancient times was Fabrateria Vetus.

According to tradition, the name was changed into the current one in the early Middle Ages. This was done in honor of one Petronius Ceccanus – father of Pope Honorius I. Conquered by the Lombards at the time of King Aistulf (c. 750), later it became an important fortress of the Papal territories. In 1218, a monk from nearby Fossanova Abbey compiled the Annals of Ceccano. From 900 to 1450, it was ruled by the local Counts of Ceccano – most likely of German origin; later their territories were assigned to Rodrigo Borgia by Pope Alexander VI and then to the Colonna family.

From 3 November 1943 and 31 May 1944, during World War II, the town suffered 38 air attacks from Allied forces despite having no strategic importance. During one of these air attacks, the Church of Santa Maria a Fiume – a national monument, was destroyed. Canadian Army war artist Charles Comfort painted the town as it appeared during the Second World War.

== Main sights ==
- Church of Santa Maria a Fiume (13th century), rebuilt on the original lines after the destruction in World War II
- Church of San Nicola (12th century), including columns with inscriptions in Lombard style.
- Castello dei Conti, a medieval castle overlooking the Sacco River Valley.
- Monumenti ai Callami, a monument commemorating the death of five children on December 1, 1951.

During excavations for the construction of the TAV high speed railroad, remains of a large Roman villa have been discovered.

== Twin towns ==
- Plouzané, France
- Cancún, Mexico
