= Collegiate Church of Santa Maria Assunta, Sermoneta =

Church in Sermoneta, Italy

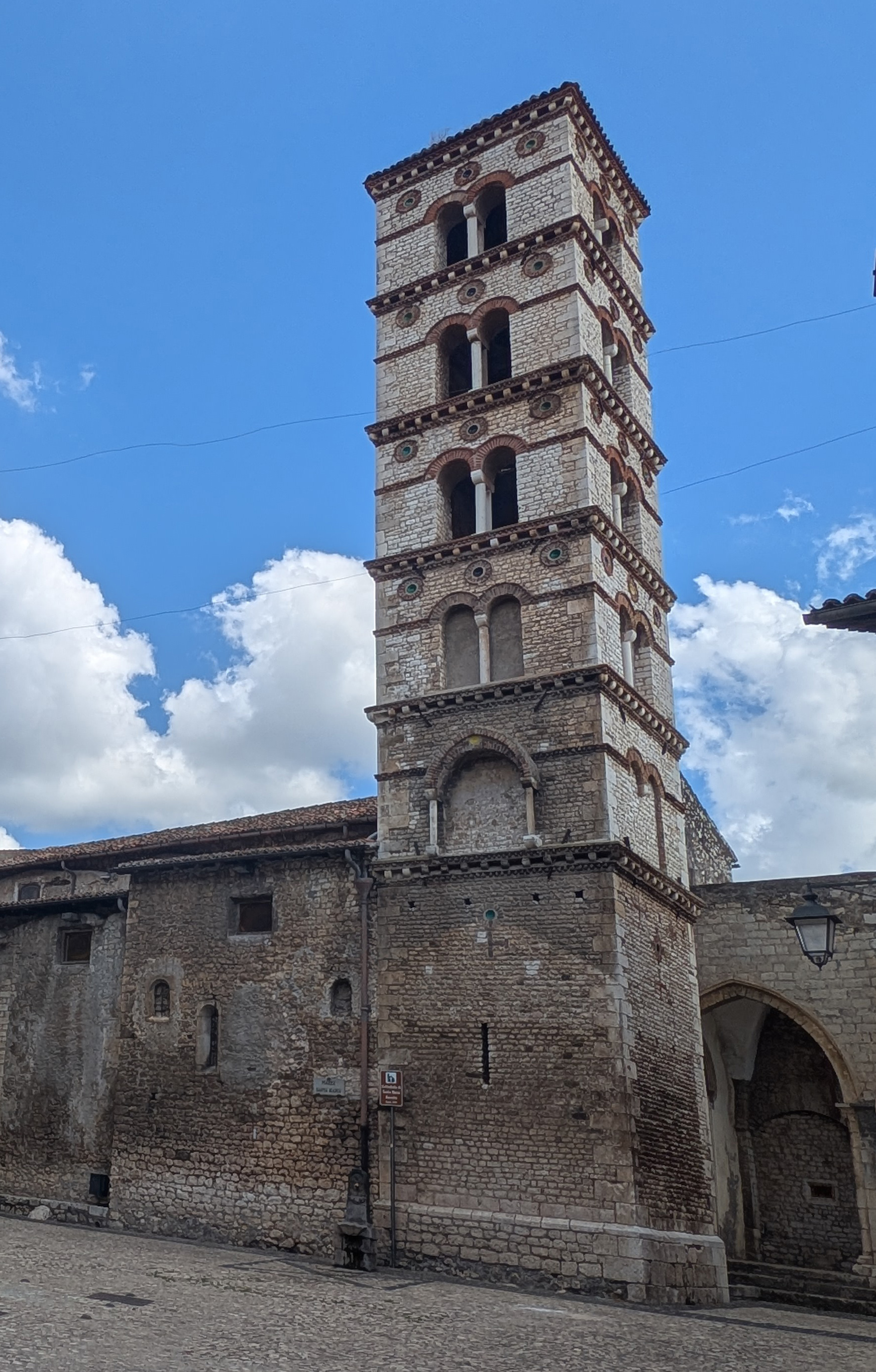

The Collegiate Church of Santa Maria Assunta (Italian: Collegiata di Santa Maria Assunta, Sermoneta) is a Gothic church located in Sermoneta, southern Lazio, Italy. The church is often referred to as a cathedral ("cattedrale") but has never been the seat of a bishop. It is dedicated to the Assumption of the Virgin Mary.

== History ==
The church is documented for the first time in the 12th century (1149–60). A palaeo-Christian church was possibly first built in the 5th century over a temple dedicated to the pagan goddess Cybele. The Romanesque church was refurbished in the next century in a Gothic style.

== Description ==
The church has a tall square bell-tower with rounded arches. The Gothic portico leads to a nave supported by marble columns. The lunette of the portico was frescoed in the 15th century with a Madonna and Child with Saints Peter and Epaphroditus and Christ and four angels by Pietro Colaberti of Piperno. The interior chapels also have frescoes.

The first chapel on the right was refurbished in the 1590s by the De Marchis family. The wall frescoes depict contemporary figures such as Carlo Borromeo and the donors. The main altarpiece, the Madonna degli Angeli (c. 1452), is attributed to Benozzo Gozzoli. Other sources attribute the work to the time after a plague epidemic or earthquake in 1456–57. The church also has frescoes attributed to Bernardino Cesari depicting the Life of the Virgin. Works of art in the church is an altarpiece depicting the Holy Family with St Anne and John from a 16th-century Neapolitan artist. The church also has a 15th-century Last Judgement fresco.

In the adjacent Diocesan Museum of Art are altarpieces including:

- Coronation of the Virgin (1576) by Girolamo Siciolante
- St. Michael Archangel (1595) by Francesco da Castello
- Madonna and Child with Saints Stephen and Lawrence (17th century)
- Annunciation (1606) by Matteo Rosselli
- Madonna of the Rosary with St Francis, Jerome, Dominic, and Catherine of Siena by Giovanni Domenico Fiorentini
- Madonna and Child with Saints Ignatius, Francesco Borgia, Stanislao Kostka, Aloysius Gonzaga, Francis Xavier, and the blessed Claudio Acquaviva by Odoardo Vicinelli
