= Annales Ceccanenses =

12–13th century universal history

The Annales Ceccanenses, also called the Chronicon Ceccanense or Chronicon Fossae Novae, is a chronicle of universal history from the birth of Jesus down to 1218. It was begun in the late twelfth and early thirteenth century by an anonymous monk of Fossanova Abbey, near Ceccano. It is partially dependent on the Annales Cavenses and Annales Casinenses, and contains no original material prior to the year 1120. After that, however, it is a valuable source, especially for the history of the Papacy.

The Annales is preserved in two manuscripts: in Rome, Biblioteca Vallicelliana, L42 and in Naples, Biblioteca Nazionale, IV.F.8. Both are transcriptions of the original from Santa Maria a Fiume made at Fossanova on 7 July 1600 by a certain Benedetto Conti di Sora. The original is now lost. According to both copies, the author of the chronicle was the "lord of Ceccano", Count John, and a member of the family of the counts of Anagni. The chronicle's first editor in 1644, Ferdinando Ughelli, accepted Conti's note about the authorship, but Ludovico Muratori pointed out that Conti could have been confused by the incorporation verbatim of certain documents issued by Count John into the chronicle itself. He therefore preferred to see it as anonymous.

In the 19th century, the editor Georg Heinrich Pertz proposed that the Annales was the work of Count John's notary, the priest Benedetto da Ceccano, who is attested in documents from 24 July 1196, 22 August 1201, 8 March 1209, 4 August 1209 and 3 September 1209. His main argument was the character of the chronicle, which incorporates Papal bulls and documents issued by the counts of Ceccano and has a keen interest in ceremonial and procession. These features give the Annales its historical value. Less informative, but more interesting are some hexameters directed against the Emperor Henry VI and his Germans incorporated into the chronicle. These are attributed to John, a deacon and monk of Monte Cassino.

== Externat link ==
- Annales Ceccanenses (in Latin)
