= Casamari Abbey =

Cistercian abbey in the Province of Frosinone, Lazio, Italy

Coordinates: 41.671°N 13.487°E

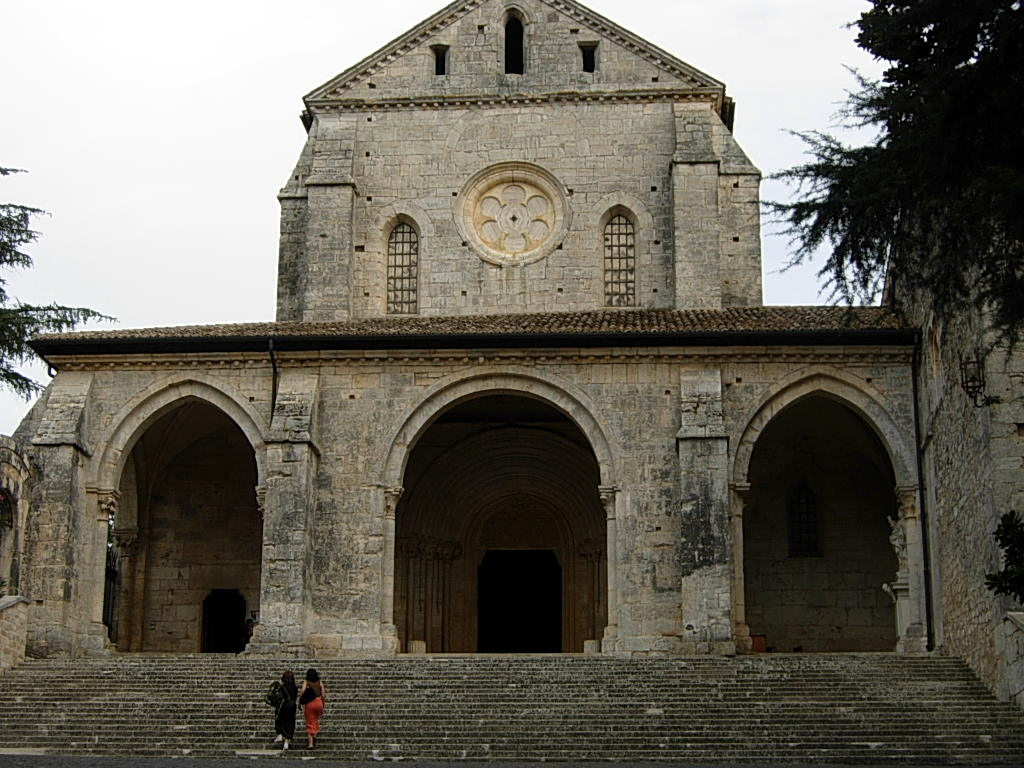
Façade of the abbey church.

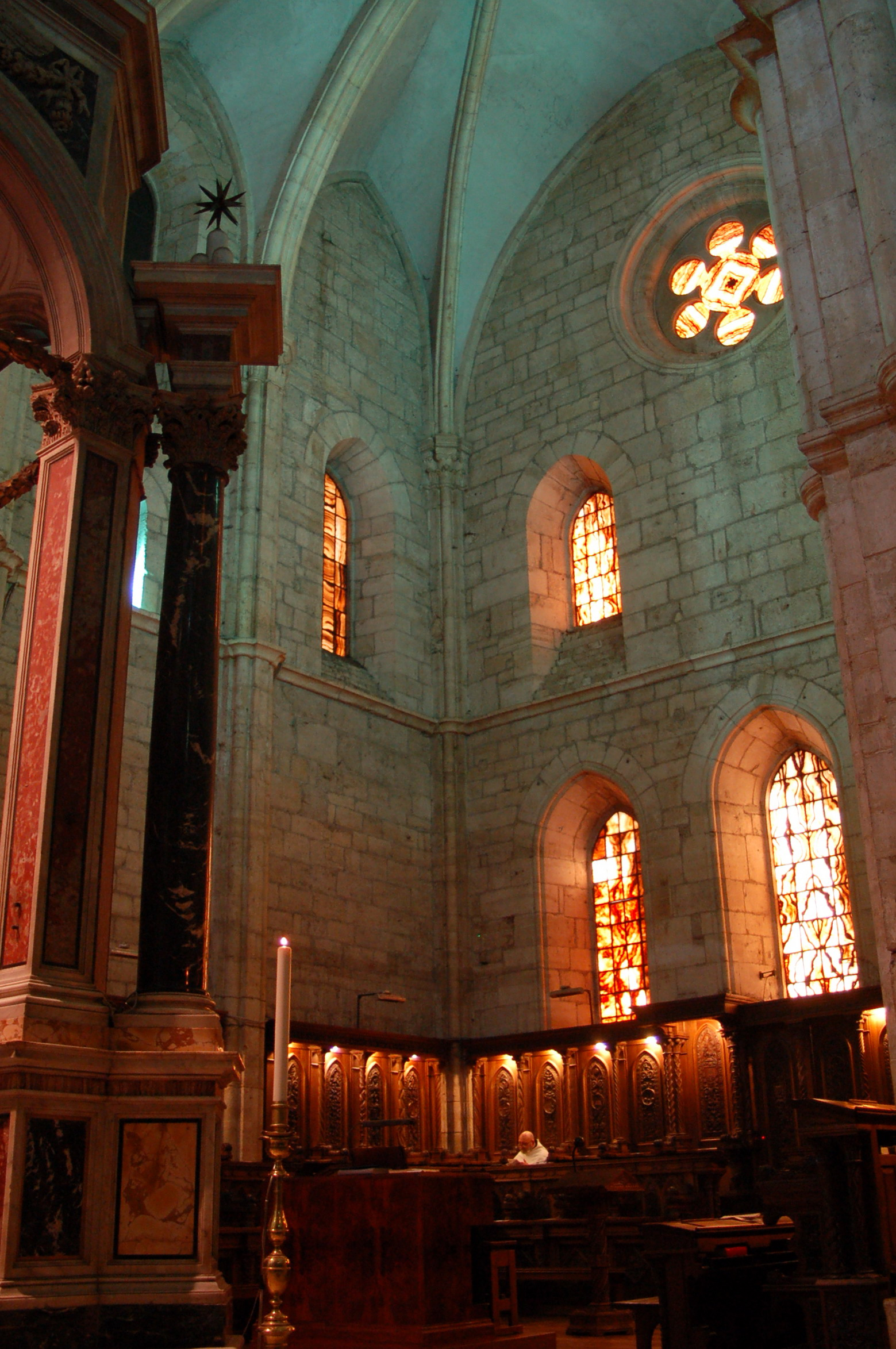
The choir of the abbey church

Casamari Abbey is a Cistercian abbey in the Province of Frosinone, Lazio, Italy, about 10 kilometers (6 miles) east-south-east of Veroli.

The abbey, mostly from 1203-1217, is a fine and very well preserved example of early Italian Gothic architecture in the Burgundian style of early-Gothic architecture, paralleled within Italy only by that of the Abbey of Fossanova. It was declared a National Monument in 1874.

The abbey has a plan similar to the French contemporary ones, the entrance being a gate with a double arch. The interior has a garden whose central part is occupied by a cloister, of quadrangular shape, with four galleries having a semi-cylindrical ceiling.

The chapter room has nine spans and four pilaster, and is used for meetings. The church can be accessed from the cloister. It has a basilica plan with a nave and two aisles; the façade has a large external portico, while behind the altar is the choir, added in 1954 and made by Vincenzo Domenico De Donatis from Sora (1886-1969) and his sons. The windows of the church are fitted with sheets of alabaster rather than glass panels.

== History ==
It marks the site of Cereatae, the birthplace of Caius Marius, afterwards known, as inscriptions attest, as Cereatae Marianae, having been separated perhaps by the triumvirs from the territory of Arpinum. In the early Imperial times it was an independent community.

=== Benedictine ===
A chronicle of the abbey from the 13th century dates its founding to the 9th century as a Benedictine monastery with the same name. Initially a small community with a simple church dedicated to Saints John and Paul, the buildings were expanded in the mid-11th century by its then-Abbot Giovanni. That it became a sphere of influence for the region at that time is shown by the large number of donations it was receiving and its acquisition of many chapels in the area whose revenues contributed to the maintenance of the abbey.

=== Cistercian ===
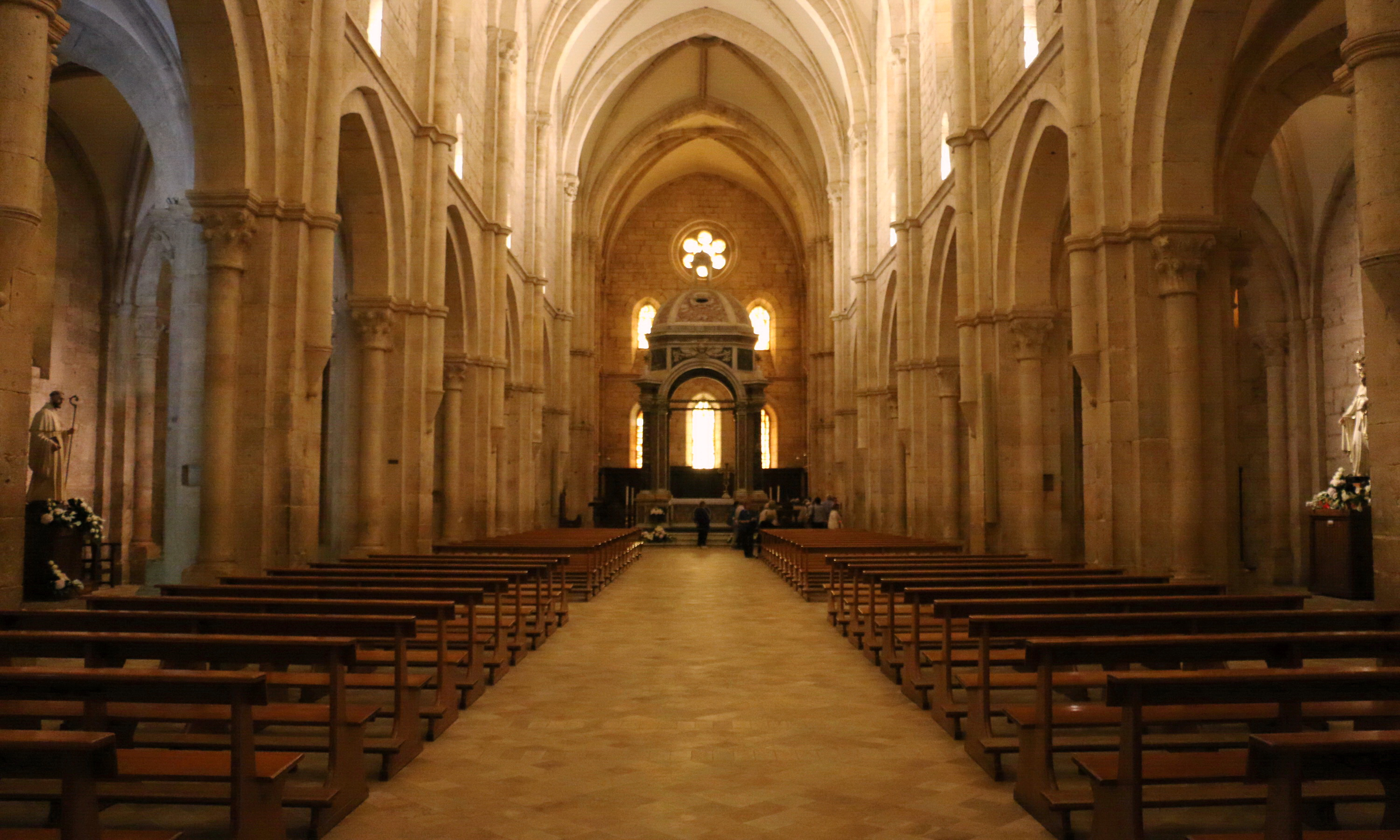
Nave of the abbey church

The 12th century, however, saw a period of long decline for the abbey. Due to the severe financial crises which arose in the shift to a capital-based economy, the region underwent great instability. In the religious realm, the Church was suffering from the contending rule of Antipope Anacletus II and Pope Innocent II. During this period, one of the major religious figures of the day, St Bernard of Clairvaux, promoted the Cistercian reforms of monasticism as the best way to ensure fidelity of life and obedience to the Church. He himself arranged the incorporation of Casamari in the new order, officially listing it in the Cistercian directory as the 29th foundation of Citeaux.

Under the Cistercians the abbey and its church were completely rebuilt between 1203 and 1217, in accordance with their own standards.

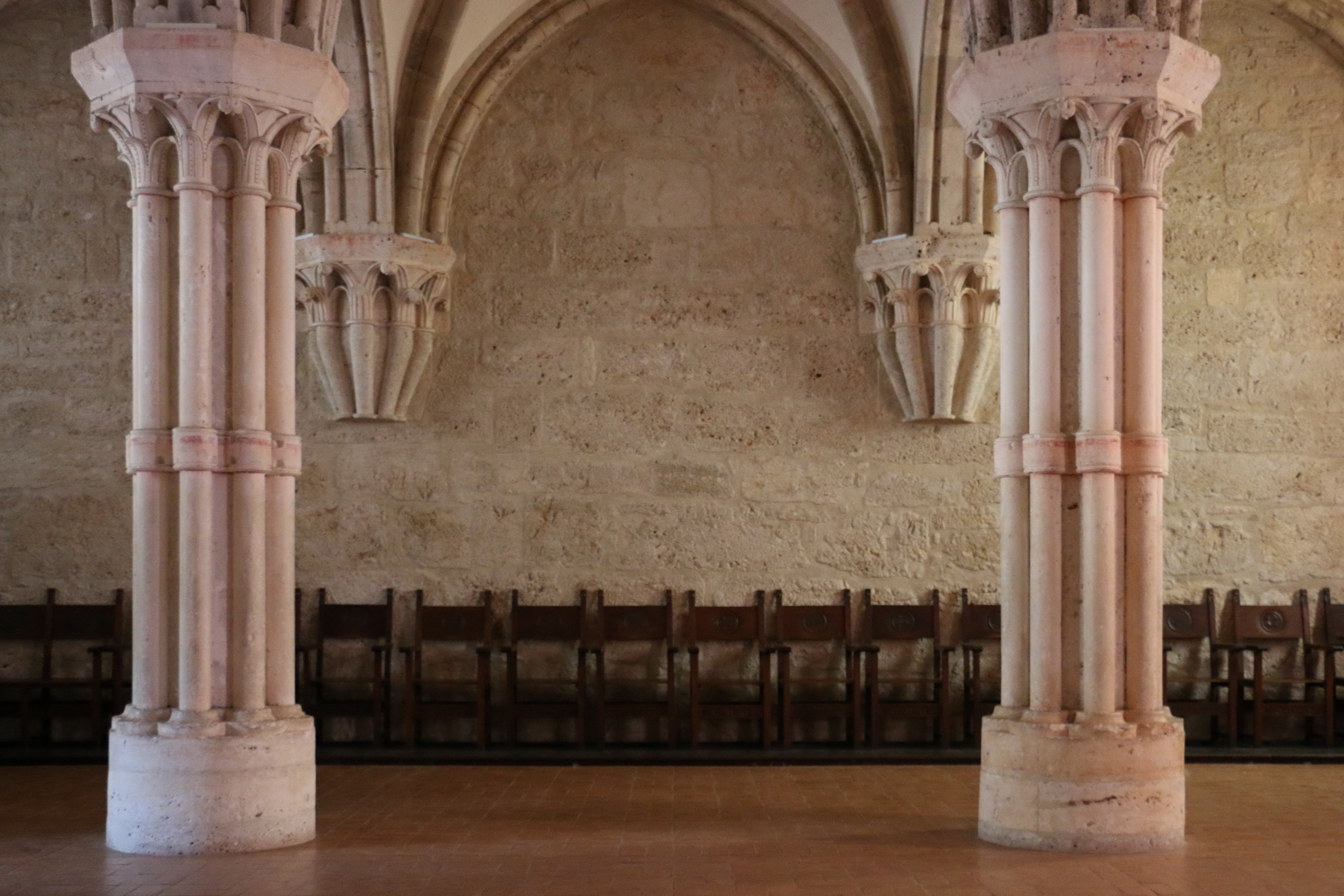
The chapterhouse

In 1417 the abbey suffered major damage due to an assault by the army of Queen Joanna II of Naples, allied with the papacy, on the forces of Braccio da Montone which had occupied the monastic complex. The entire western wing of the abbey was destroyed in the battle.

An equally major blow was soon given to the life of the monastic community in 1430, when Pope Martin V made his nephew, Cardinal Prospero Colonna, the commendatory abbot of Casamari, thereby giving him the control of the abbey's finances. By 1623 the community had been reduced to eight monks. As a result, it joined eight other abbeys to form the Roman Congregation for their mutual support. This union lasted until 1650.

In 1717, the commendatory abbot at that time, Annibale Albani, made an attempt to reform and reinvigorate the community by introducing the Trappist reform, bringing several monks for this purpose from the Trappist monastery of Buonsollazzo in Tuscany, part of the Italian Congregation of St. Bernard.

==== Suppression ====
At the start of the 19th century, Italy found itself invaded by the forces of the First French Empire. In the course of the Napoleonic Wars, several French soldiers stopped at the abbey on May 13, 1799, when returning from the assault on Naples. They were well received by the prior, Simon Cardon, a fellow Frenchman. Nevertheless, the soldiers proceeded to sack the abbey in next days, including the church, where they broke open the tabernacle and scattered the consecrated hosts on the floor. When Cardon and five of his fellow monks went to recover the hosts, they were shot by the soldiers. Declared martyrs, they were buried within the church itself, as opposed to the abbey graveyard, however the official pronouncement was issued in Vatican only in May 2020. Soon, though, the abbey, along with most other religious communities, was suppressed by a decree of Napoleon in 1811.

==== Revival ====
Within a few years, by 1814, some of the surviving monks returned to the abbey and were able to resume monastic life, now under the direct authority of the Holy See. In 1825 Pope Pius IX officially ended the office of commendatory abbot. The monks of Casamari incorporated the Monastery of San Domenico, near Sora, under their jurisdiction in 1833. Valvisciolo Abbey, near Sermoneta, also came under their authority in 1864 . At that point Casamari, along with its dependencies, was able to establish itself as an autonomous congregation, directly subject to the Holy See. Keeping their adherence to the Trappist reform, they resisted later pressures put on them at the start of the 20th century to join the Congregation of Subiaco.

=== Congregation of Casamari ===
In 1929 the Holy See formally recognized the Congregation of Casamari, and united it with the other congregations which form the Cistercian Order (though not the Trappists). The monks began to extend their work to include the pastoral care of nearby parishes and opened a seminary. At the invitation of Pope Pius XI they began to consider expansion to foreign missions.

==== The Venerable Father Felix ====
At this point in time, Father Felix Mary Ghebreamlak, a priest of the Ethiopian Catholic Church, was directed to Casamari, due to his desire to introduce Catholic monastic life to his country. The community there accepted his request to sponsor a community of the Order in Ethiopia and train the candidates for such a community. Ghebreamlak entered, along with 12 other Ethiopian Catholic men.

Within a few years of his admission to the Order, Ghebreamlak was diagnosed with incurable tuberculosis. Allowed to profess religious vows on his deathbed, he died in 1934 and was buried at Casamari. The reputation he had for holiness of life drew the veneration of the Ethiopian clergy. The local Catholic Diocese, along with the Ethiopian Catholic Church, opened a process of investigating his life for possible canonization. The cause was eventually approved and accepted by the Holy See for further investigation.

In 1957 the abbey church was designated a basilica minor by Pope Pius XII.

=== Current status ===
The abbey made its first overseas foundation in Ethiopia in 1940. There are now four monasteries of the congregation there, with some 100 native monks. Foundations were also made subsequently in Brazil and the United States. The total membership of the congregation numbers some 200 monks. The abbey notes that, with the exception of the three years that they were disbanded under Napoleon, there has been a continuous monastic presence there since its founding.

The Abbot of the Abbey of Casamari, as of 2017, is the Right Reverend Abbot Dom Eugenio Romagnuolo, President of the Cistercian Congregation of Casamari.
