= San Giuseppe, Sermoneta =

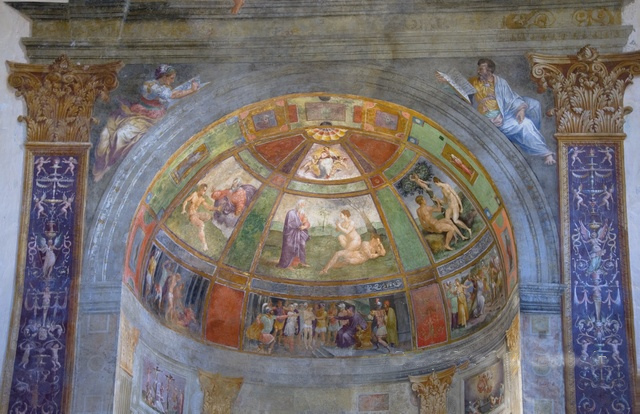
- 41°32′55″N 12°59′06″E
- Location: Sermoneta, Italy
- Denomination: Roman Catholic

Architecture
- Style: Renaissance

San Giuseppe is a Renaissance-style, deconsecrated Roman Catholic church located in the center of Sermoneta, region of Lazio, Italy.

== History and description ==
The façade was erected after 1520, and construction continued until 1733. The apse shows traces of the Romanesque architecture of the original church. The small church is best known for two chapels with Renaissance-style frescoes, including a shallow Caetani chapel with frescoes by Girolamo Siciolante.
