= Antonio Cavallucci =

Italian painter (1752–1795)

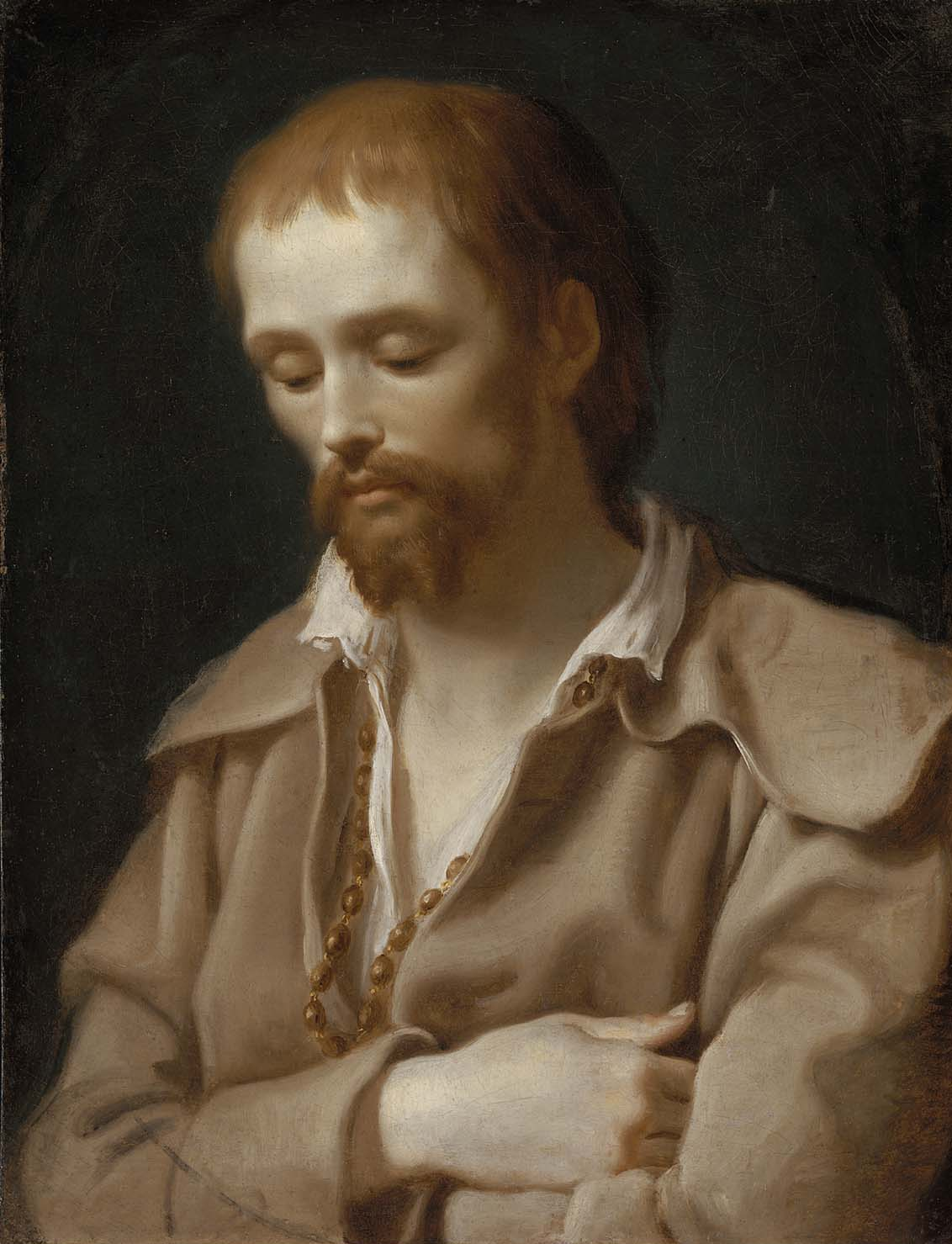
Antonio Cavallucci, Benedict Joseph Labre, before 1783. Museum of Fine Arts, Boston

Antonio Cavallucci (21 August 1752 – 18 November 1795) was an eighteenth-century Italian painter of religious scenes and portraits. One of the leading Roman Neoclassical painters, Cavallucci was influenced by Pompeo Batoni and Anton Raphael Mengs. There is in his art some of the northern European feeling that had made its way into Rome at the end of the eighteenth century.

== Biography ==
=== Early career ===
Cavallucci was born in Sermoneta in the Lazio. His artistic talents were recognized in an early stage by Francesco Caetani, Duke of Sermoneta in 1738-1810. In 1765, he brought the 13-year-old Cavallucci to Rome, where he became a pupil of Stefano Pozzi and three years later of Gaetano Lapis. He also studied drawing at the Accademia di San Luca (c. 1769-1771).

His earliest work dates from the mid-1760s. It is a tempera frieze in the Casa Cavallucci in Sermoneta. His first portrait was of his benefactor Duke Francesco Caetani. This portrait is only preserved as an engraving in 1772 by Pietro Leone Bombelli (1737–1809).

His first major commission was the decoration of five audience chambers in the Caetani Palace in Rome in 1776. He painted mythological scenes and allegories appropriate for each room. Three pictures from 1773 – Abigail before David (Rome, Palazzo Caetani), the Departure of Hector and Andromache (Rome, Galleria dell'Accademia Nazionale di San Luca) and the Crucifixion with Saints (Rome, Palazzo Corsini) – all demonstrate a tempered academic style, fluid plasticity and delicate manner.

=== Mature career ===
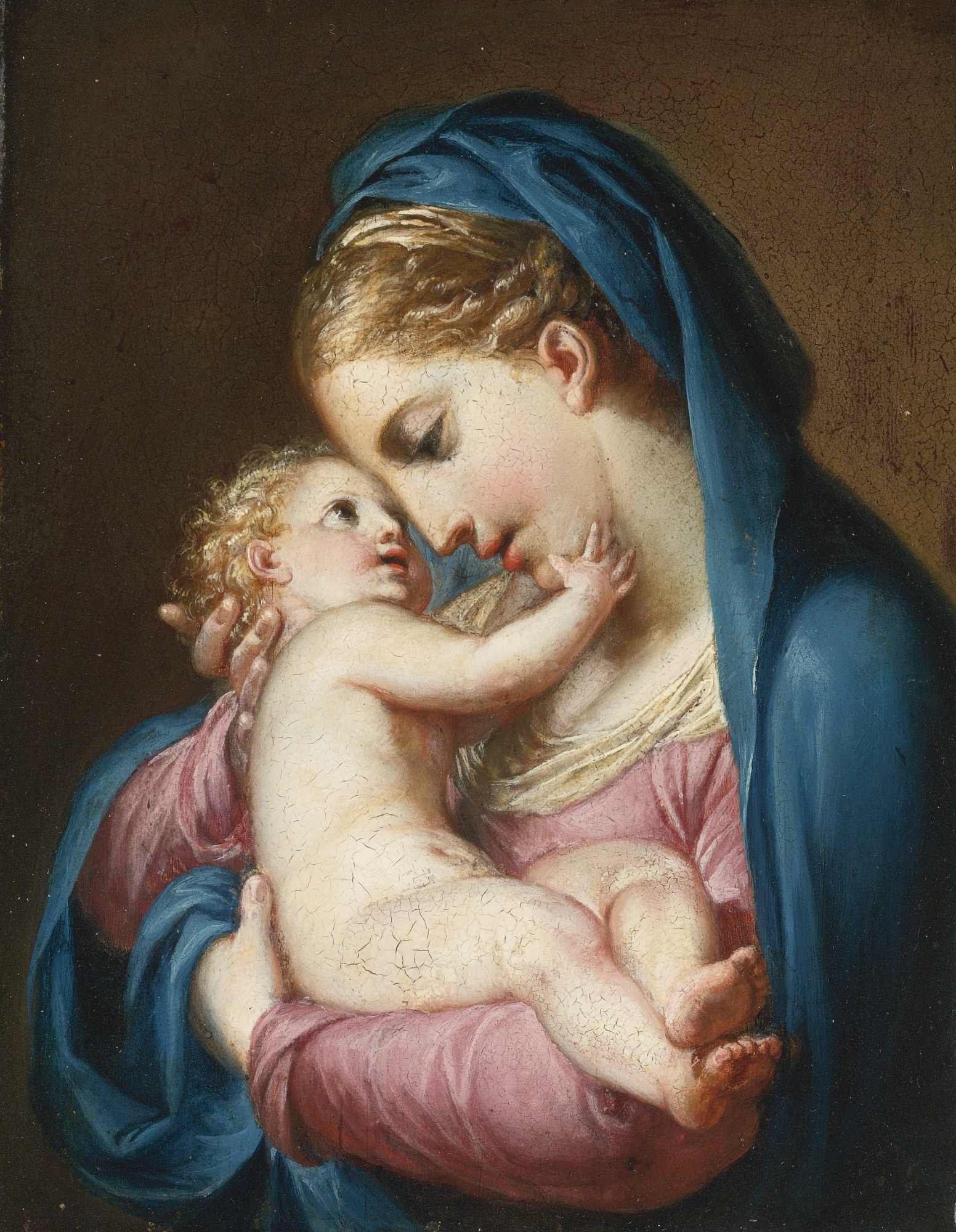
Madonna Embracing the Christ Child (attributed to Cavallucci).

Cavallucci’s most distinguished work for the Caetani began in 1776 when he was commissioned to decorate five audience chambers in the Palazzo Caetani, Rome, with canvases showing mythological scenes and familial allegories appropriate to the individual theme of each room. The assured style of these pictures confirms Cavallucci’s reputation as one of the foremost Neoclassical artists in Rome in the late 18th century, but they equally reveal a new, neo-Baroque tendency in the reformulation of 16th-century precedents, especially those derived from Raphael.

During the 1770s and early 1780s Cavallucci continued to produce portraits, notably those of Francesco Caetani and his first wife Teresa Corsini, Duchess of Sermoneta (both 1777; Rome, Palazzo Caetani). In 1786 he painted the Presentation of the Virgin for Spoleto Cathedral and was admitted to the Accademia di San Luca. The most outstanding picture of this period was the Origin of Music (1786–7; Rome, Palazzo Caetani), its iconographic inspiration drawn from Cesare Ripa’s Iconologia (Rome, 1593).

=== Later career ===
In his later years Cavallucci frequently travelled in Italy, in 1787 notably in the retinue of his patron, the nephew of pope Pius VI. Cardinal Romoaldo Braschi-Onesti. In Rome he received numerous commissions from members of the Braschi family, including Pius VI, whose portrait he is said to have executed c. 1788 along with that of Romoaldo Braschi-Onesti (Tivoli, Braschi Theodoli priv. col.).

By 1788 Cavallucci belonged to the Academy of Arcadia and in that year was also admitted to the Pontifical Academy of Fine Arts and Letters of the Virtuosi al Pantheon. In 1791 he painted the Investiture of St. Bona for Pisa Cathedral and in 1793 was in Naples, where he portrayed the Principe del Belvedere (Naples, Museo di Capodimonte). He also worked for Cardinal Francesco Saverio de Zelada, who collected many of his paintings and for whom in 1793 he decorated the Cappella del Carmelo in the Cardinal’s titular church, San Martino ai Monti, Rome (e.g. Elijah on Mount Carmel). Cavallucci died in Rome in 1795. Among his pupils were the Portuguese painter Domingos Sequeira and the Roman painters Giovanni Micocca and Tommaso Sciacca.

Cavallucci is said to have painted St Benedict Joseph Labre while the saint was in ecstasy, or (as is perhaps more plausible), having seen the saint in ecstasy, to have brought him to his studio and painted his portrait there.

== Selected works ==
- Abigail before David (1773)
- Departure of Hector and Andromache (1773)
- Crucifixion with Saints (1773)
- Presentation of the Virgin (1786) in Spoleto Cathedral
- Thomas of Cori (levitation) (1786), Eucharistic museum of Hieron, Paray-le-Monial, France
- Venus with Ascanius, at the Palazzo Cesarini in Rome
- Investiture of St. Bona (1791), Cathedral of Pisa
- Principe del Belvedere (1793), Gallerie di Capodimonte, Naples
- St. Elias and the Purgatory (1793) S. Martino ai Monti, Rome
- Altar piece in the Church of San Nicolò in Catania, Sicily
- St. Francis announces the Pardon to the people in the Chapel of St Diego d’Alcalà in the Basilica of Santa Maria degli Angeli in Assisi.
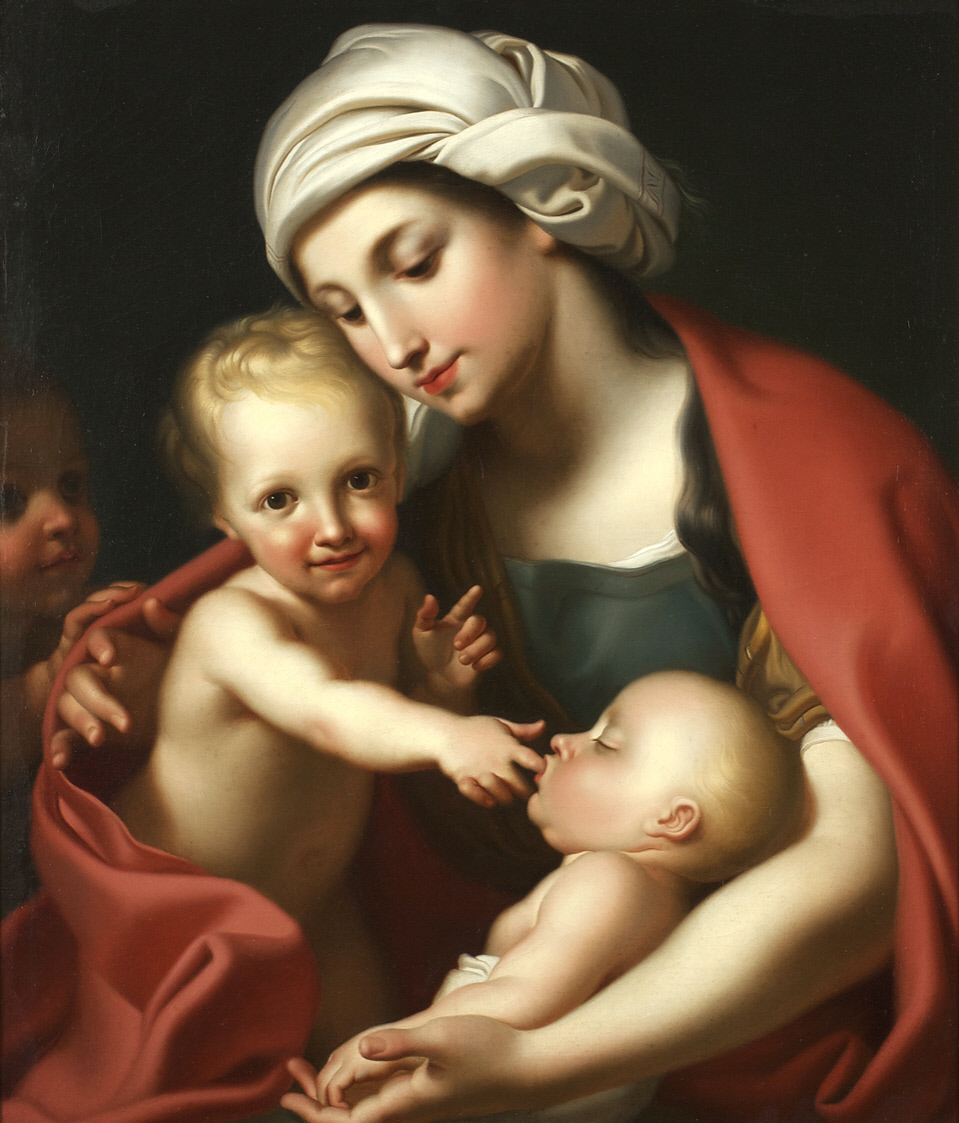
Caritas with three children, Vienna, Kunsthistorisches Museum

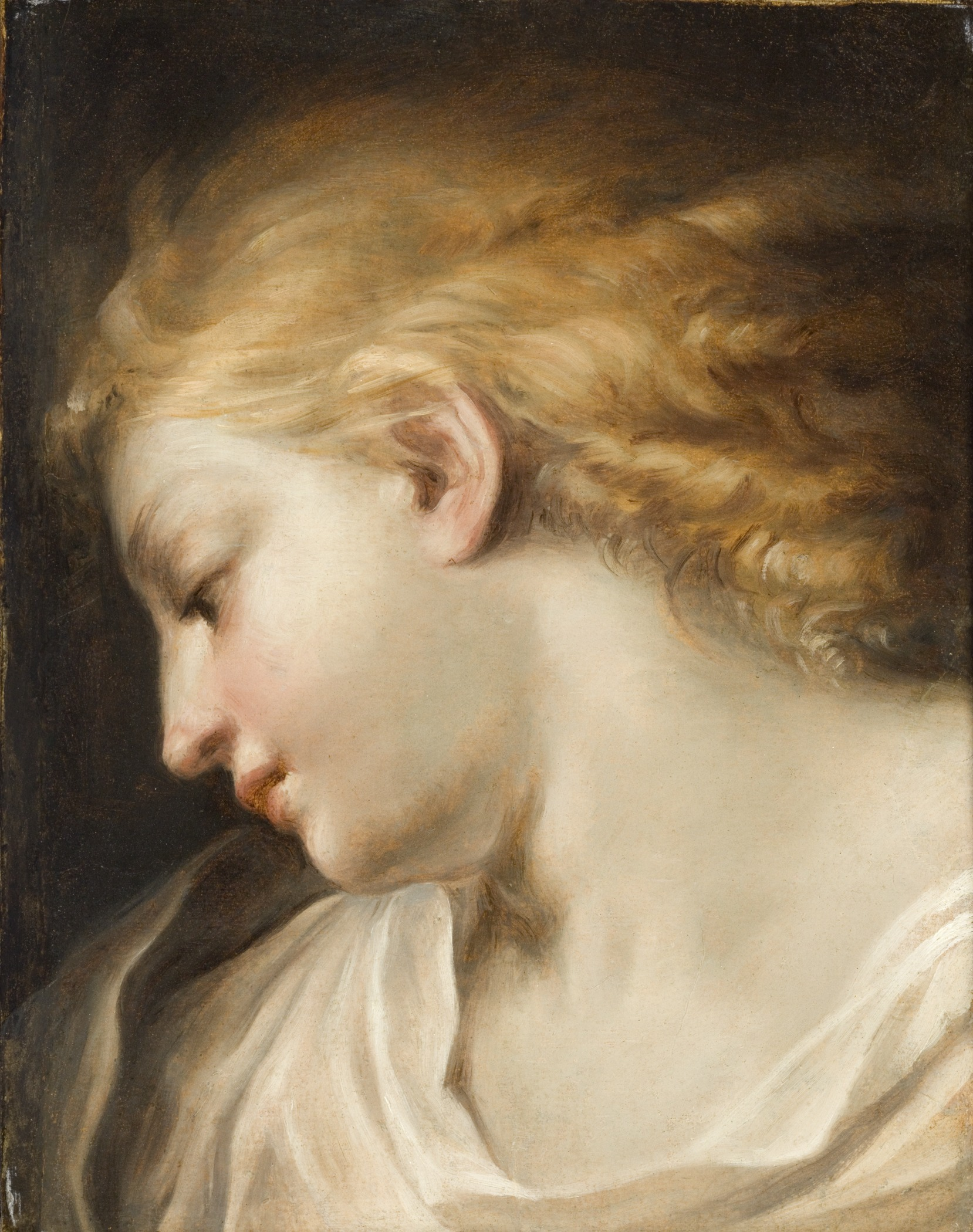
Head of an Angel, Los Angeles, Los Angeles County Museum of Art

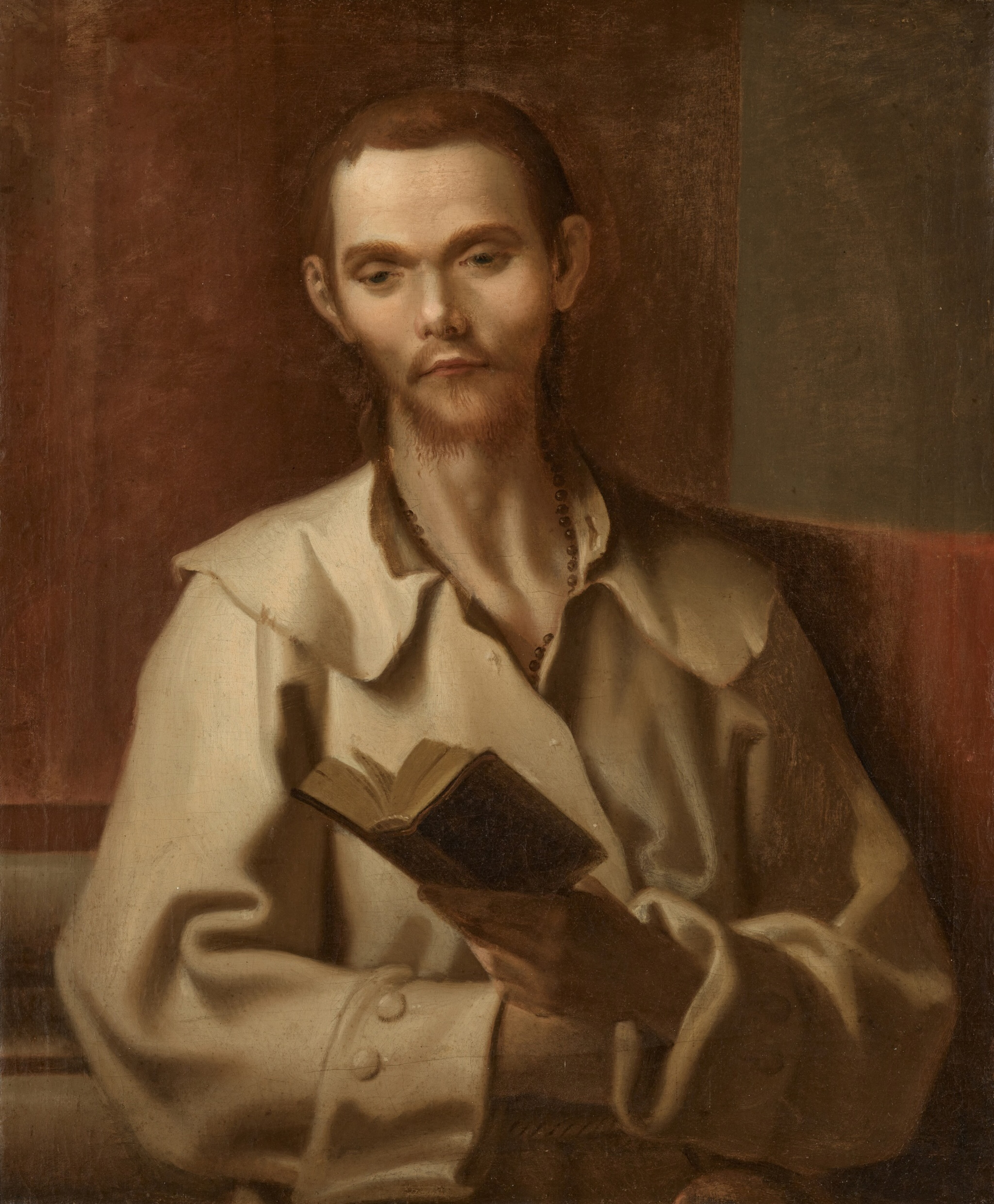
Portrait of Saint Benedict Joseph Labre, private collection

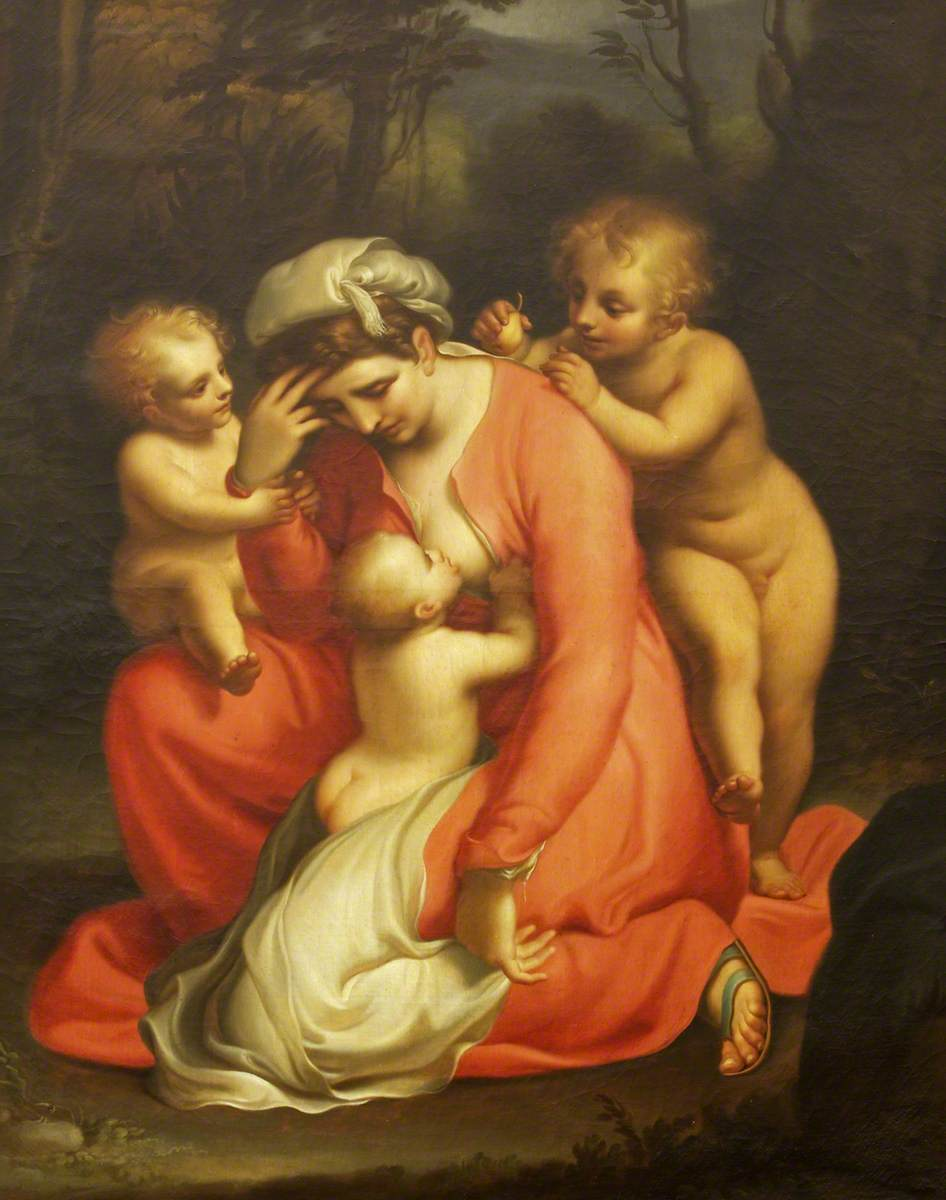
Sorrowing Charity, London, National Trust

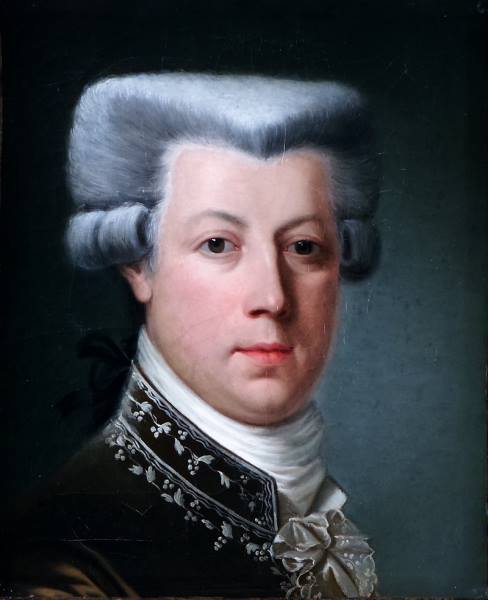
Portrait of Luigi Braschi-Onesti (Detail)

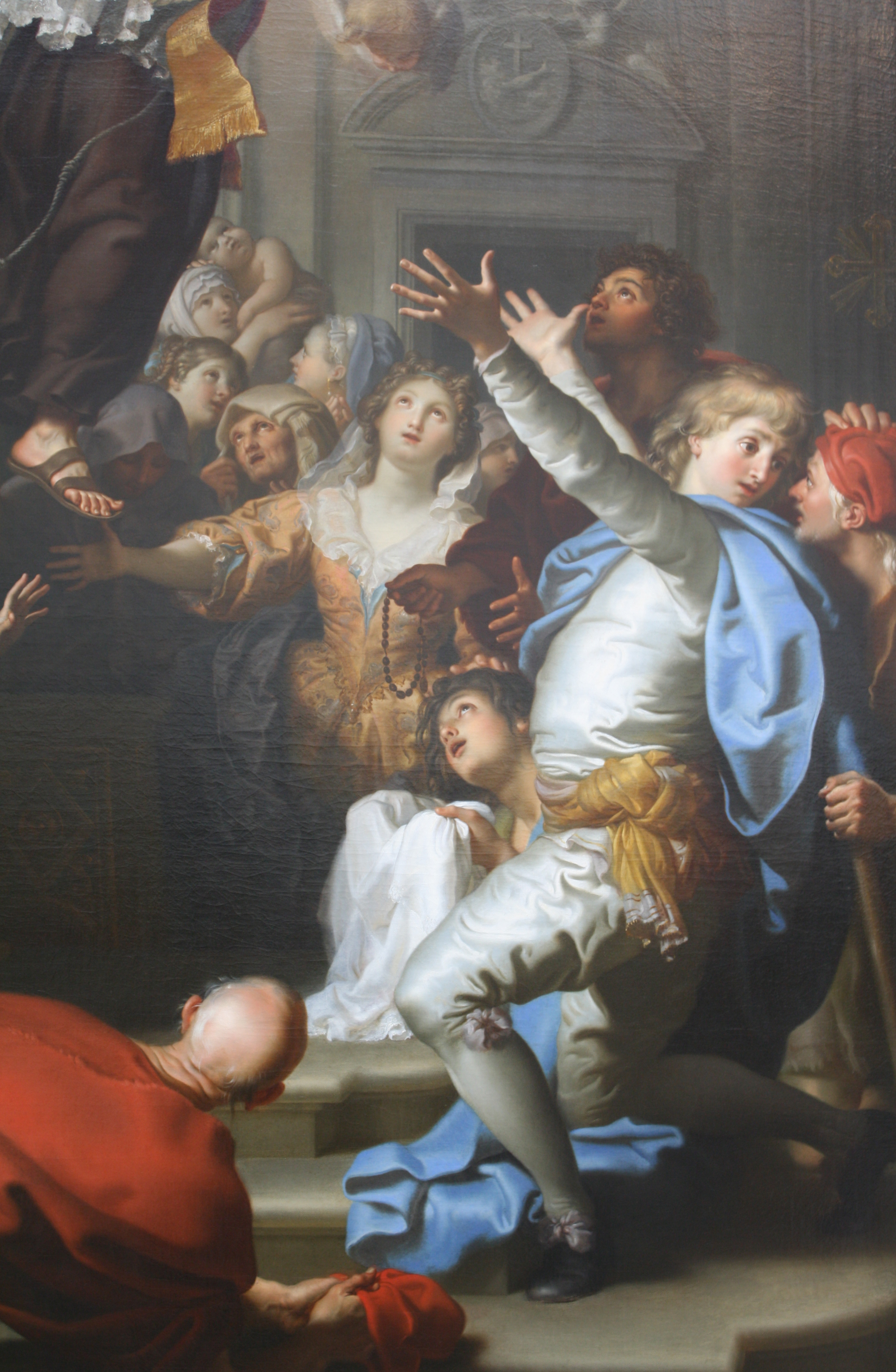
The Levitation of Saint Thomas of Cori (Detail), Paray-le-Monial, Musée du Hiéron

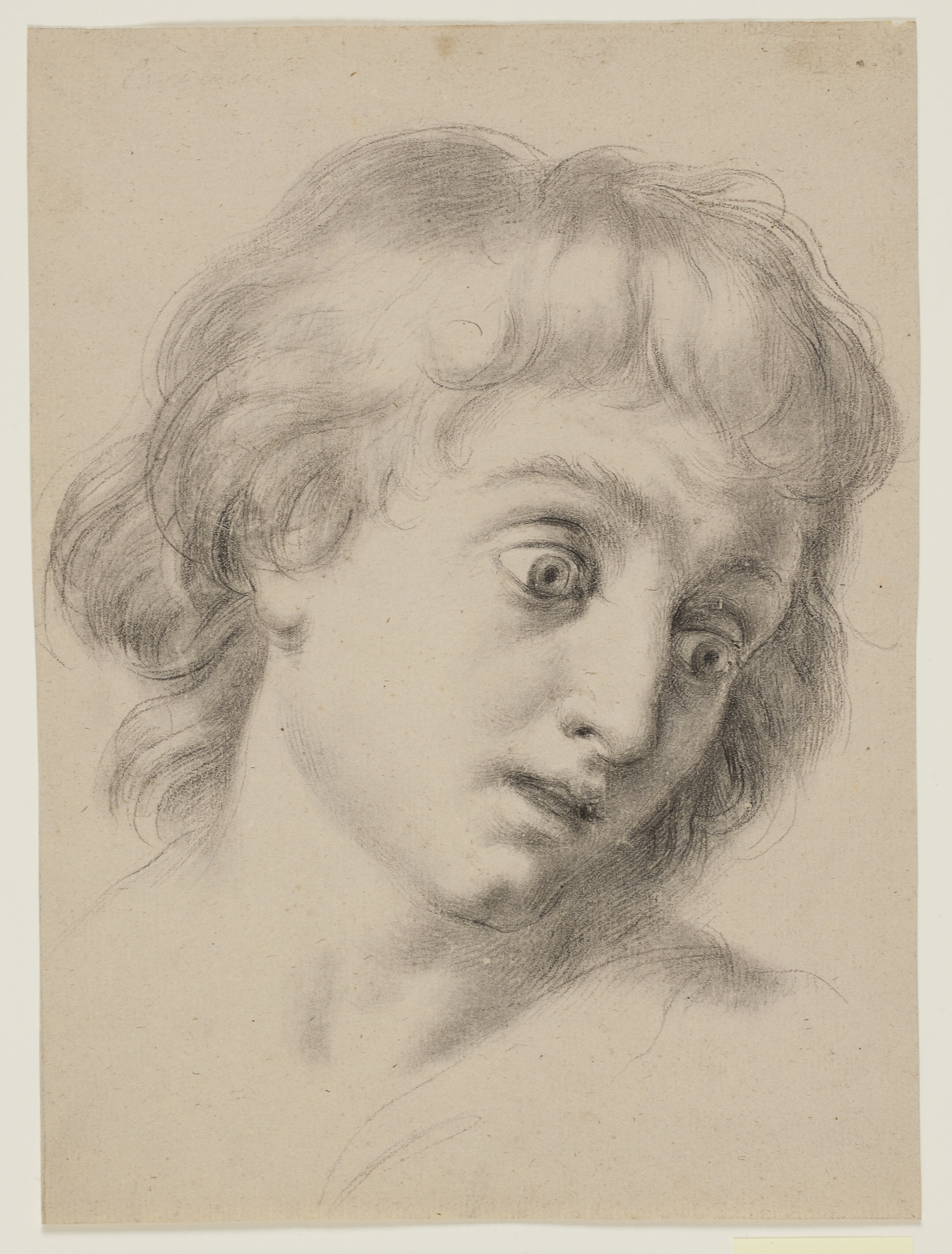
Head of a boy, Copenhagen, National Gallery of Denmark

== Bibliography ==
- Vinci, Giovanni Battista (1795). Elogio storico del celebre pittore Antonio Cavallucci di Sermoneta. Rome: Antonio Fulgoni.
- Farquhar, Maria (1855). Ralph Nicholson Wornum (ed.). Biographical catalogue of the principal Italian painters. London: Woodfall & Kinder. p. 44.
- Roettgen, Stefi (1979). "CAVALLUCCI, Antonio". Dizionario Biografico degli Italiani (in Italian). Vol. 23: Cavallucci–Cerretesi. Rome: Istituto dell'Enciclopedia Italiana. ISBN 978-88-12-00032-6.
- Turner, Jane, ed. (1996). Grove Dictionary of Art. Macmillan Publishers. ISBN 1-884446-00-0.
- Sperindei, Simona, ed. (2016). "Addenda all'opera di Antonio Cavallucci". Annali della Pontificia Insigne Accademia di Belle Arti e Lettere dei Virtuosi al Pantheon: 415–420.
