= Valvisciolo Abbey =

Coordinates: 41°34′4″N 12°58′52″E

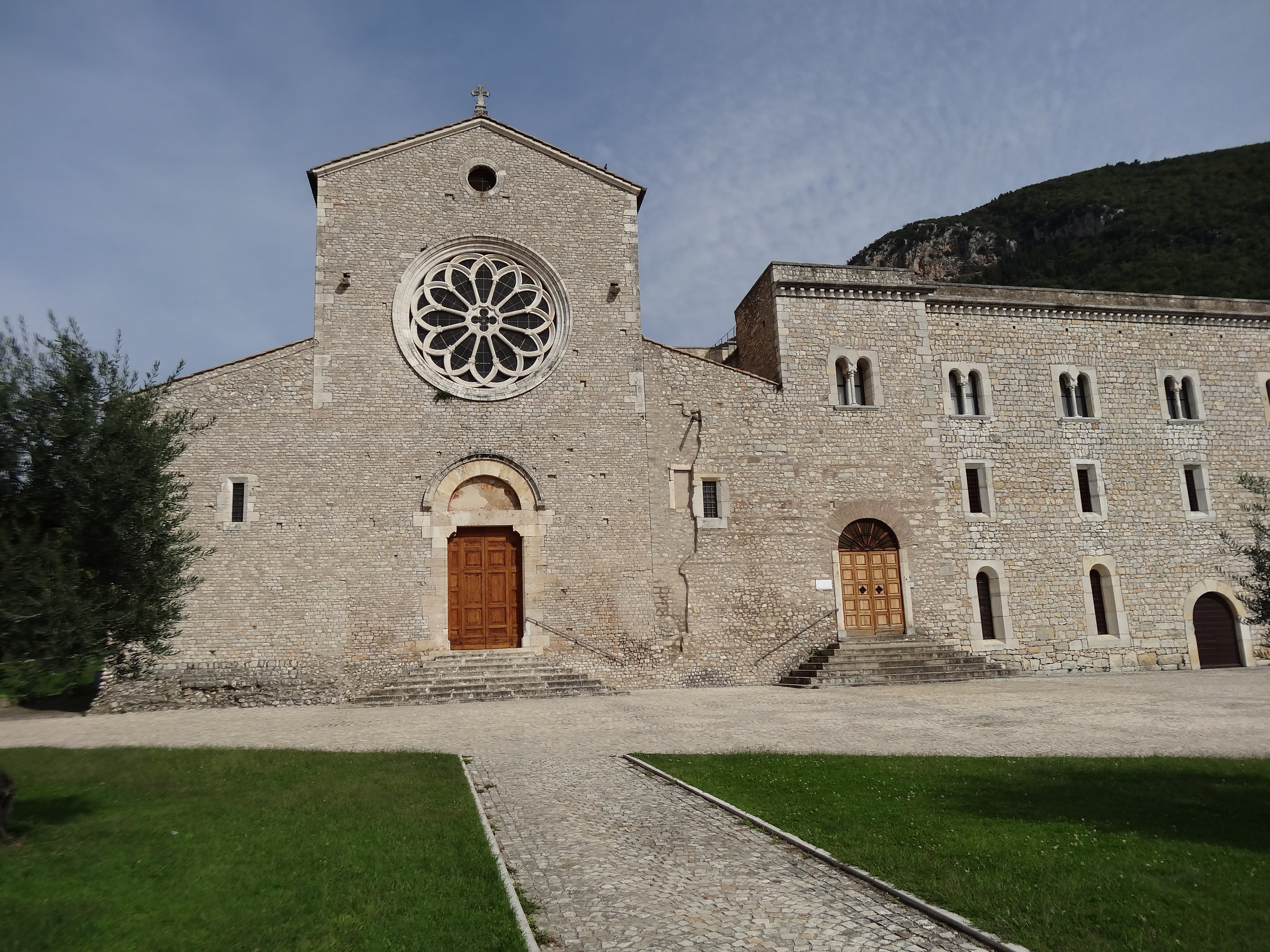
Façade of the abbey church

Valvisciolo Abbey is a Cistercian monastery in the province of Latina, central Italy, near the towns of Sermoneta and Ninfa.

It is an example of rigorous Romanesque-Cistercian architecture, considered a masterpiece of that style in central Italy second only to the nearby Fossanova Abbey.

== History ==
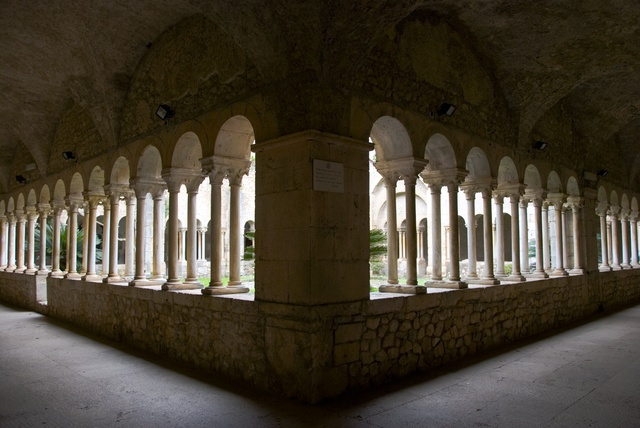
Valvisciolo Abbey

According to tradition, the abbey was founded in the 8th century by Greek Basilian monks. Some sources state that it was established in 1145 by the monks of Cistercian order, by monks from the Abbey of Fossanova. Likely damaged during the 12th-century invasion of Barbarossa, it was occupied and restored by the Knights Templar in the 13th century, who after the dissolution of their order were replaced first briefly by Augustinians, then again by the Cistercians in 1312-15. The abbey had some turnover in the early 17th-century, but ultimately remained Cistercian. The monastery was dissolved in 1807 but was re-settled in 1864 and is still extant.

According to a medieval legend, when the Templar Grand Master Jacques de Molay was burnt at the stake in 1314, the church's architraves broke. The Templar influence can be still noticed today from several crosses with their characteristic shape, such as that in the rose window. During a restoration, a Templar palindromic Sator Square was discovered on a wall: it is the only known variant in which the letters form five concentric rings, each one divided into five sectors.

In 1411 the abbey passed into the hands of Paolo Caetani as commendatory abbot. In 1523 Pope Clement VII reduced it to the rank of a priory, and in 1529 it was further reduced to a secular priory. From 1600 or 1605 it was occupied by Cistercians of the Congregation of the Feuillants until 1619. Between 1619 and 1635 the premises were used by the Minims of Saint Francis of Paola. The Feuillants then returned and remained there until the suppression of religious orders enforced by Napoleon Bonaparte.

Pope Pius IX made two important visits to the abbey in 1863 and 1865, and by his order the community here was re-established, as a priory dependent upon the congregation of Casamari. The abbey continues until today to accommodate Cistercian monks of the same congregation.

== Buildings ==
The interior of the church consists of a nave and two aisles divided by pilasters and columns. The walls are plain, according to the Cistercian taste. At the end of the north nave is the Chapel of Saint Laurence, painted with frescoes in the years 1586-89 by Niccolò Circignani, known as "il Pomarancio" on commission from Cardinal Enrico Caetani. Over the main entrance portal a rose window can be seen. The cloister, located to the right of the abbey and looking onto the façade, has a brightly coloured garden.

The abbey is situated in a small valley known by medieval tradition as the valley of the nightingale.

== Sources ==
- Testa, Sonia, 2007: Abbazia di Valvisciolo, "Vallis Lusciniae" Ars et Historia. Grafica 87, Pontinia 2007.
