= Girolamo Siciolante da Sermoneta =

Italian painter (1521–c.1580)

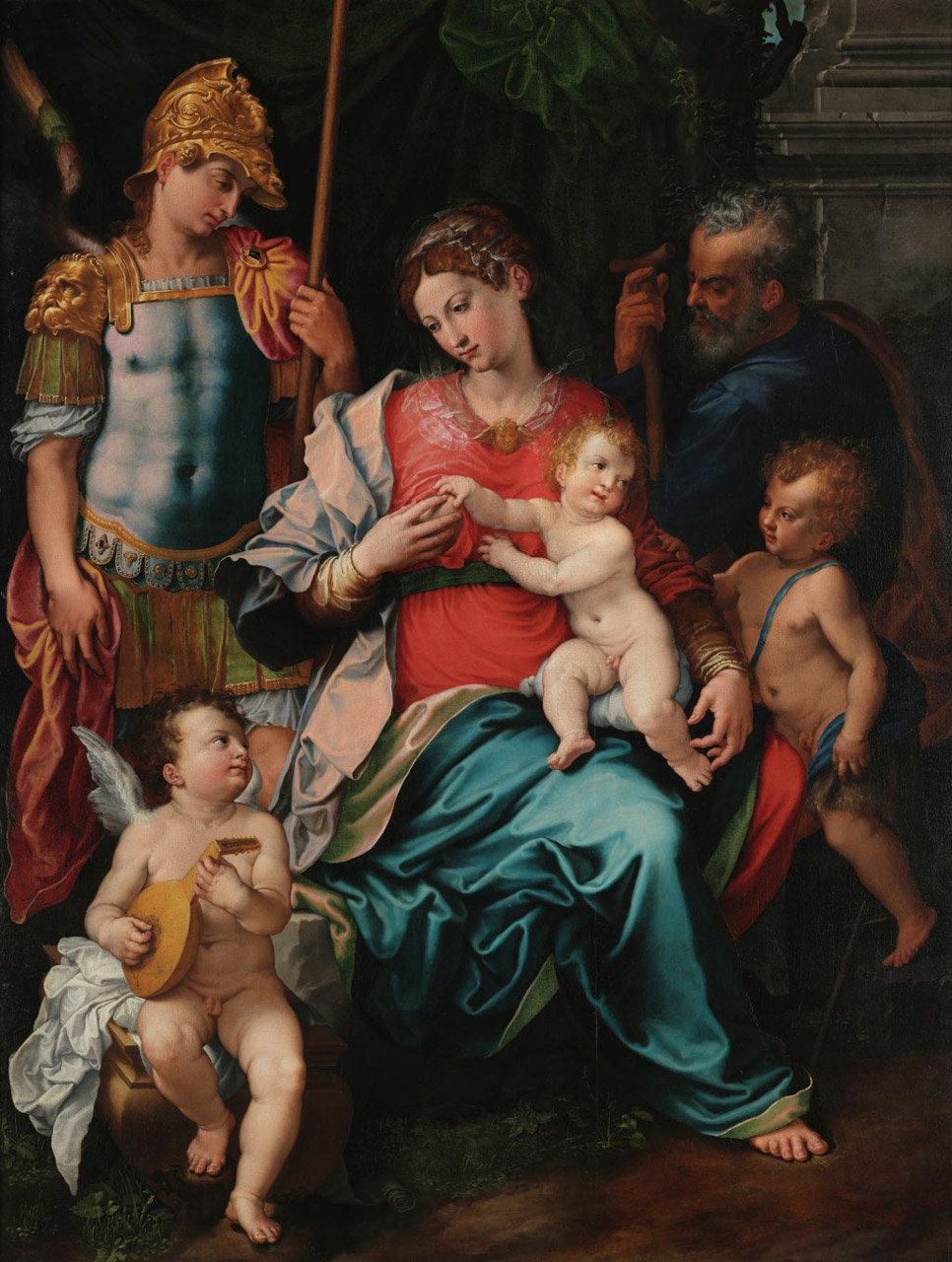
Girolamo Siciolante da Sermoneta, Madonna and Child with Saints Michael the Archangel, Joseph, and the infant John the Baptist, 1545-46 Galleria nazionale di Parma

Girolamo Siciolante da Sermoneta (1521 – c. 1580) began his career as an Italian Mannerist painter but later adopted the reformist naturalism of Girolamo Muziano in the 1560s and 70s. He was active in Rome in the mid 16th century.

== Biography ==
Native to Sermoneta, he was reputed to have been a pupil of Leonardo da Pistoia. His first known work is an altarpiece once in the Valvisciolo Abbey, now in the Palazzo Caetani in Rome. In Piacenza he painted a Holy Family with Saint Michael (1545–1546). In 1548, he painted a Madonna with Six Saints for San Martino Maggiore in Bologna. In 1548-1549 In collaboration with Jacopino del Conte, he completed the Raphaelesque style frescoes depicting the Baptism of Clovis in the Remigius chapel of the church of San Luigi dei Francesi, which had been left unfinished by Perino del Vaga.

In the 1550s, he painted the Crucifixion as an altarpiece for the Spanish national church in Rome, San Giacomo degli Spagnoli, paid for by a donation from Prince Philip of Spain. Framed in marble, it was flanked by two side panels depicting St. Ildefonsus and St. James. The Crucifixion was later relocated to Santa Maria in Monserrato degli Spagnoli.

In the 1560s, he painted a Life of the Virgin for San Tommaso ai Cenci and a Crucifixion for San Giovanni in Laterano, both in Rome.

He was one of many Mannerist contributors to the Sala Regia of the Palazzo Quirinale. Also in Rome, he painted a Transfiguration for Santa Maria in Aracoeli; a Nativity for Santa Maria della Pace; and a Martyrdom of Saint Catherine for Santa Maria Maggiore in 1568. He painted a Virgin enthroned with saints for the church of San Bartolomeo at Ancona.

He painted a series of highly ornate frescoes for the Palazzo Baronale at Cisterna di Latina (destroyed during World War II).

== Sources ==
- Freedberg, Sydney J. (1993). Pelican History of Art (ed.). Painting in Italy, 1500-1600. Penguin Books. pp. 495–499.
- Farquhar, Maria (1855). Ralph Nicholson Wornum (ed.). Biographical catalogue of the principal Italian painters. London: Woodfall & Kinder. p. 164. "Wornum."
- Chisholm, Hugh, ed. (1911). "Perino del Vaga" . Encyclopædia Britannica. Vol. 21 (11th ed.). Cambridge University Press. p. 151.
