= San Michele Arcangelo, Sermoneta =

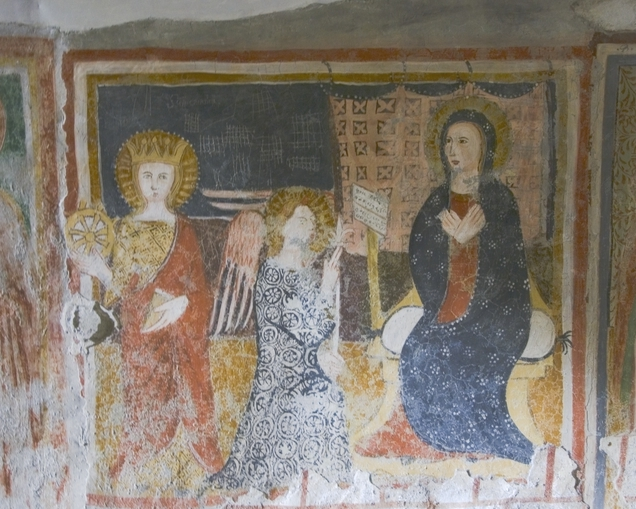
- 41°33′03″N 12°58′58″E
- Location: Sermoneta, Italy
- Denomination: Roman Catholic

Architecture
- Style: Romanesque

San Michele Arcangelo is a Romanesque-style, Roman Catholic located in the center of Sermoneta, region of Lazio, Italy.

== History and description ==
The stone church was putatively built in the 11th century atop the ruins of an ancient pagan temple. The facade is made of non-hewn, irregular stones and sports awkward elements such as a portico entering from the alley at a right angle. The nave is subdivided with two aisles. The church crypt has Romanesque-era frescoes by unknown authors. The organ is from the 18th century and the baptistry from 1603.

The church was once affiliated with a confraternity of flagellants known as the Battenti.
