= Annales Cavenses =

Annals

The Annales Cavenses are a chronicle compiled at the La Trinità della Cava abbey in Cava de' Tirreni, province of Salerno, southern Italy. It consists of annalistic entries spanning the years 568 to 1318, i.e. essentially the entire duration of the Middle Ages in Italy (but only for the last two centuries or so compiled contemporaneously with the events recorded).

Some of the entries are of scientific interest as historical records of events such as earthquakes or astronomical phenomena. The text was first edited in 1839 by Georg Heinrich Pertz in his Monumenta Germaniae Historica.

Not to be confused is the so-called Chronicon Cavense (also known as Annalista Salernitanus), a work which was once considered authentic but in 1847 was established as an 18th-century forgery due to Francesco Maria Pratilli (Georg Heinrich Pertz, Rudolf Köpke, Über das Chronicon Cavense und andere von Pratillo herausgegebene Quellenschriften, in "Archiv der Gesellschaft für ältere deutsche Geschichtskunde", IX (1847), 1–239).
