= Felix Mary Ghebreamlak =

Ethiopian Cistercian monk and priest (1895-1934)

Venerable Felix Mary Ghebreamlak O.Cist
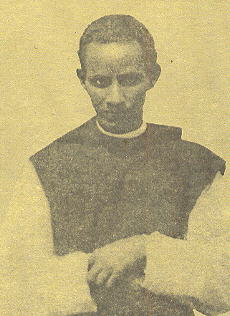
- The Venerable Felix Mary Ghebreamlak, O.Cist.

Monk, Priest
- Born: 23 June 1895; Guifa, Eritrea, Italian colony
- Died: 8 June 1934 (aged 38); Sora, Lazio, Italy
- Venerated in: Eritrea Catholic Church

Felix Maria Ghebreamlak, O.Cist, (23 June 1895 – 8 June 1934) was an Eritrean monk and priest of the Ethiopian Catholic Church who worked to bring the Cistercian Order to his homeland. A process seeking his canonization is underway.

== Biography ==
Ghebreamlak was born on 23 June 1895 in the village of Guifa in Eritrea, then an Italian colony, to parents who were Ethiopian-rite Catholics and who raised him in that faith. At the age of 12, he entered the Minor Seminary at Cheren (now Keren). He was ordained to the priesthood as part of the secular clergy on 22 September 1918.

Ghebreamlak then worked to bring the Monophysite and Orthodox Christians back into union with the Roman Catholic Church. Since Ethiopians respect monastic life, he sought to continue his work in Ethiopia as a monk. When, in 1925, he was sent to the Ethiopian College in Rome to serve there as confessor for the seminarians, he took the opportunity to learn more about Benedictine life. He studied monastic theology and sought advice from the Abbot of St. Paul outside the Walls, Ildefonso Schuster.

Casamari Abbey, a Cistercian monastery, accepted his project of establishing a monastery in his homeland, and Ghebreamlak entered there as a candidate on 7 December 1930. As he entered the monastic enclosure he is said to have kissed the threshold and exclaimed: "These are the gates of paradise." He was joined in 1931 by a group of twelve fellow Ethiopian candidates.

Ghebreamlak was diagnosed with incurable tuberculosis in 1933. With death imminent, he was permitted to make his solemn monastic profession on 4 April 1934, eight months ahead of time. While hospitalized in Sora, he died on 8 June 1934, the Feast of the Sacred Heart that year, and was buried in the monastic cemetery at Casamari Abbey. His last words are said to have been: "Jesus, I love you and want to love you always".

Soon other Ethiopians entered Casamari with the goal of founding Cistercian monasteries in Ethiopia. Today there are five Cistercian monasteries in his native country. Veneration of him started early, especially among the Ethiopian and Eritrean clergy, who prayed at his grave. The cause for Ghebreamlak's canonization was started in 1955, with formal investigations of his life being carried out from 1956 to 1960, being officially accepted by the Holy See in 1969. From 1980, further investigations were carried by the Diocese of Sora and the Ge'ez Rite Archeparchy of Asmara. On 24 March 1992, Ghebreamlak's virtues were officially declared to be heroic by Pope John Paul II.

== Literature ==
- Columbano De Cristofaro: Il servo di Dio D. Felice Maria Ghebre Amlak (Abba Haylé Mariam). Istitutore e primo monaco del monachesimo cattolico etiopico. Casamari 1959.
- Sorana beatificationis et canonizationis servi Dei Felicis Mariae Ghebre Amlak, sacerdotis professi Sacri Ordinis Cisterciensis. Informatio super dubio. Romae 1970.
