= Palazzo Mattei Caetani =

Coordinates: 41°53′41″N 12°28′41″E

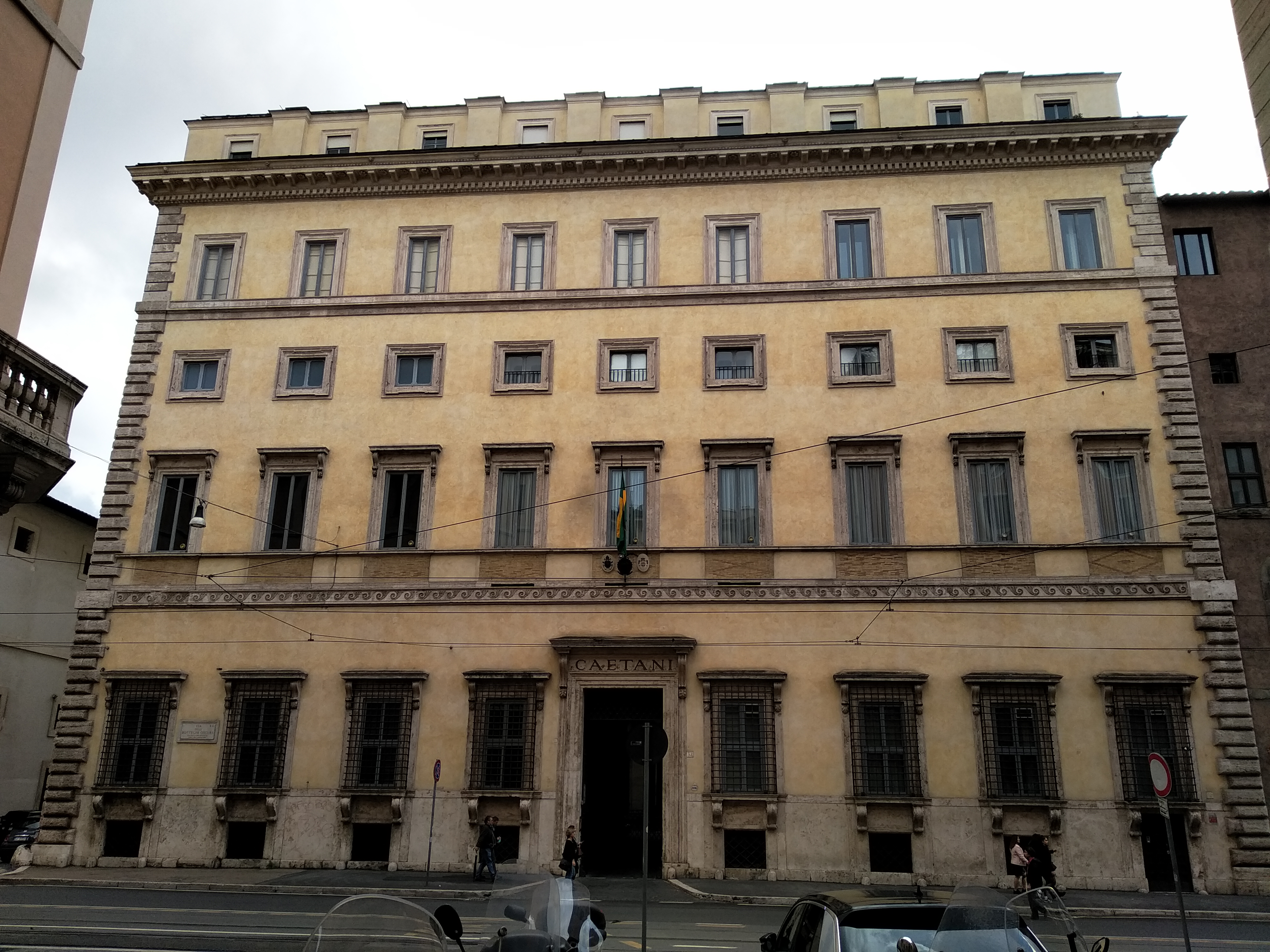
Facade of Palace.

The Palazzo Caetani, also known as the Palazzo Mattei Caetani, and once known as the Palazzo of Alessandro Mattei or the Palazzo Mattei alle Botteghe Oscure, is an urban palace located on via delle Botteghe Oscure #32 in the rione Sant'Angelo of Rome, Italy.

A palace at the site was initially commissioned from the architect Nanni di Baccio Bigio between 1545 and 1564 by Alessandro Mattei; this structure was purchased in 1776, by the Caetani, and has undergone numerous refurbishments. The building contains a number of tenants, including the Brazilian embassy to the Vatican, but also houses the Fondazione Camillo Caetani, including its library. The interior decoration was begun by Alessandro Mattei, who employed the brothers Taddeo and Federico Zuccari in painting some of the works in the piano nobile. Cristoforo Roncalli painted the palace chapel, and collaborated with Paul Bril, to decorate some of the rooms. The Caetani family employed Antonio Cavallucci in some of the 18th-century decorations.
