= Sermoneta =

- Comune
- Comune di Sermoneta
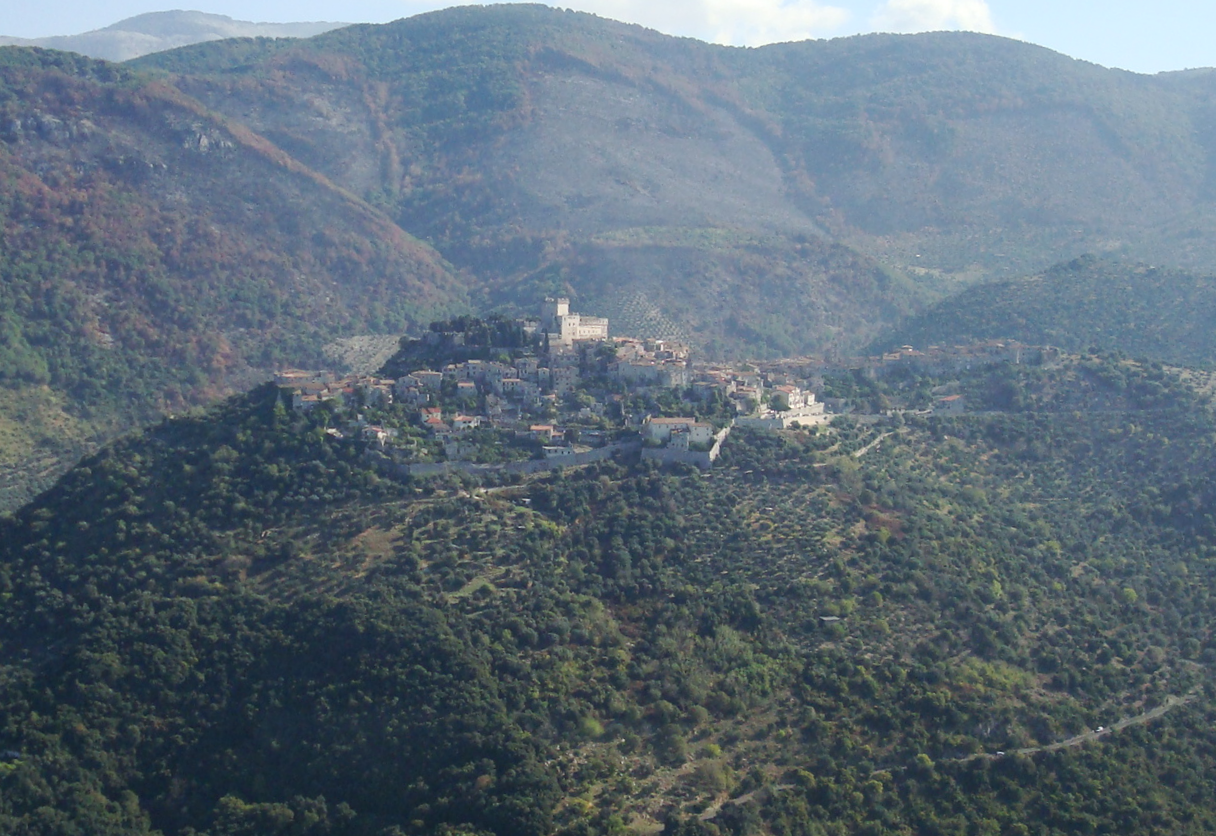
- Sermoneta from above in October 2007

- Coat of arms

- Location within Italy Location within Lazio
- Coordinates: 41°33′N 12°59′E
- Country: Italy
- Region: Lazio
- Province: Latina (LT)
- Frazioni: Carrara, Doganella, Monticchio, Pontenuovo, Sermoneta Scalo, Tufette

Government
  - Mayor: Giuseppina Giovannoli (Civic list)

Area
  - Total: 44 km^{2} (17 sq mi)
- Elevation: 257 m (843 ft)

Population (31 July 2015)
  - Total: 9,836
  - Density: 220/km^{2} (580/sq mi)
- Demonym: Sermonetani
- Time zone: UTC+1 (CET)
  - Summer (DST): UTC+2 (CEST)
- Postal code: 04013
- Dialing code: 0773
- Patron saint: St. Joseph
- Saint day: March 19
- Website: Official website

Sermoneta is a hill town and comune in the province of Latina (Lazio), central Italy.

It is a walled hill town, with a 13th-century Romanesque church, the Collegiate Church of Santa Maria Assunta (sometimes erroneously called a cathedral) and a massive castle, built by the Annibaldi family then purchased and expanded by Caetani family in the 13th century. The Cistercian Valvisciolo Abbey is located nearby. The churches of San Giuseppe (mainly 16th century) and San Michele (mainly 12th century) still stand.

A Jewish community engaged in the commerce of fish and lending is attested there from the 13th to the 16th centuries, when the community was removed following Pope Pius V's papal bull of expulsion, Hebraeorum gens sola (1569), which restricted Jewish residency to Rome and Ancona. The current holder of the title of Duca di Sermoneta is Carlos Egerton Bragança de Bourbon del Monte Caetani Sforza (b. 1993), a Italo-Brazilian descendant of princess Lelia de Bourbon del Monte Caetani Sforza, who was married to the Portuguese nobleman Luís Virgílio Gomes Martinho Bragança.

== Notable residents ==
- Girolamo Siciolante (1521-1575), painter;
- Fabritio Caroso (1526/1535 – 1605/1620), Renaissance dancing master, poet, and author of dancing manuals;
- Antonio Cavallucci (1752–95), painter;
- Marguerite Caetani and Roffredo Caetani (1932–c.1945);
- Ubaldo Righetti (1963- ), retired football player;
- Cesare Battisti (1954- ), ex terrorist;
- Elena Santarelli (1981- ), actress;

== Twin towns ==
- Arborea, Italy
- Saint-Antoine-l'Abbaye, France
- Atalanti, Greece
