= Francesco Maria Pratilli =

Italian Priest

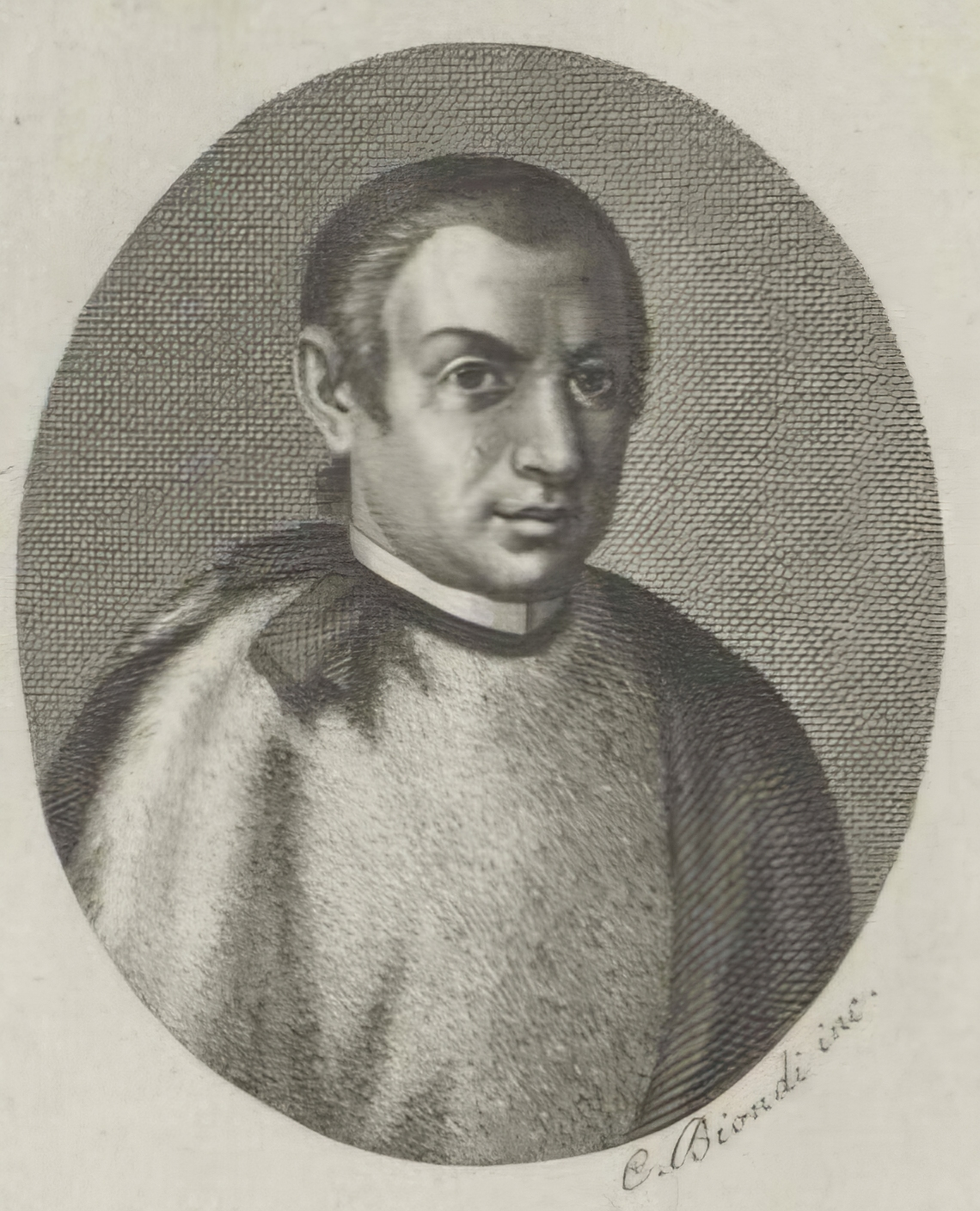
Francesco Maria Pratilli

Francesco Maria Pratilli (1689–1763) was an Italian priest, scholar, antiquarian, whose name is known, from the 19th century, for being involved in a vast series of skilled forgeries.

== Life and works ==
Born in Santa Maria in Сapuа, where he was canon, he lived mostly in Naples where he died. King Charles III of Bourbon made him a member of the Accademia Ercolanese.

=== Works ===
His writings span both ecclesiastical, theological, numismatic topics, often disseminated by his historical forgeries.

Among his works are:

- Della Via Appia, libro IV, Naples, 1745.
- Lettera sopra una moneta singolare del tiranno Giovanni, Naples 1748.
- Dissertazione su i consolari della Campania, Naples, 1757.
- Della Metropolis ecclesiastica della chiesa di Capua, Naples 1758.
- Relazione della concessione de' pontificati fatta da Benedetto XIII al capitolo di Capua, Naples, 1725.
- Lettera sopra un antico marino in cui si fa parola di Giove Ortense, volumen 28 della raccolta del Calogera.
- Lettera sur l'antico equatutico.
- Lettera sur una moneta di Guglielmo II il Buono.
- Lettera sur la colonia in Bauli.
- Vita di Camillo Pellegrino-De monasterio Theanensi (volumen 1 della Historia principum Longobardorum).
- De familia et patria Divi Thomae de Aquino.
- De Ludovico Imperator Augusti captivate-De Liburia.
- Chronicon Cavense, an alleged 12th century chronicle, which in 1847, due to the conclusive work of Pertz and Köpke, it revealed to be "one of the most audacious forgeries of the eighteenth century".
