= Fossanova Abbey =

Abbey in Priverno, Italy

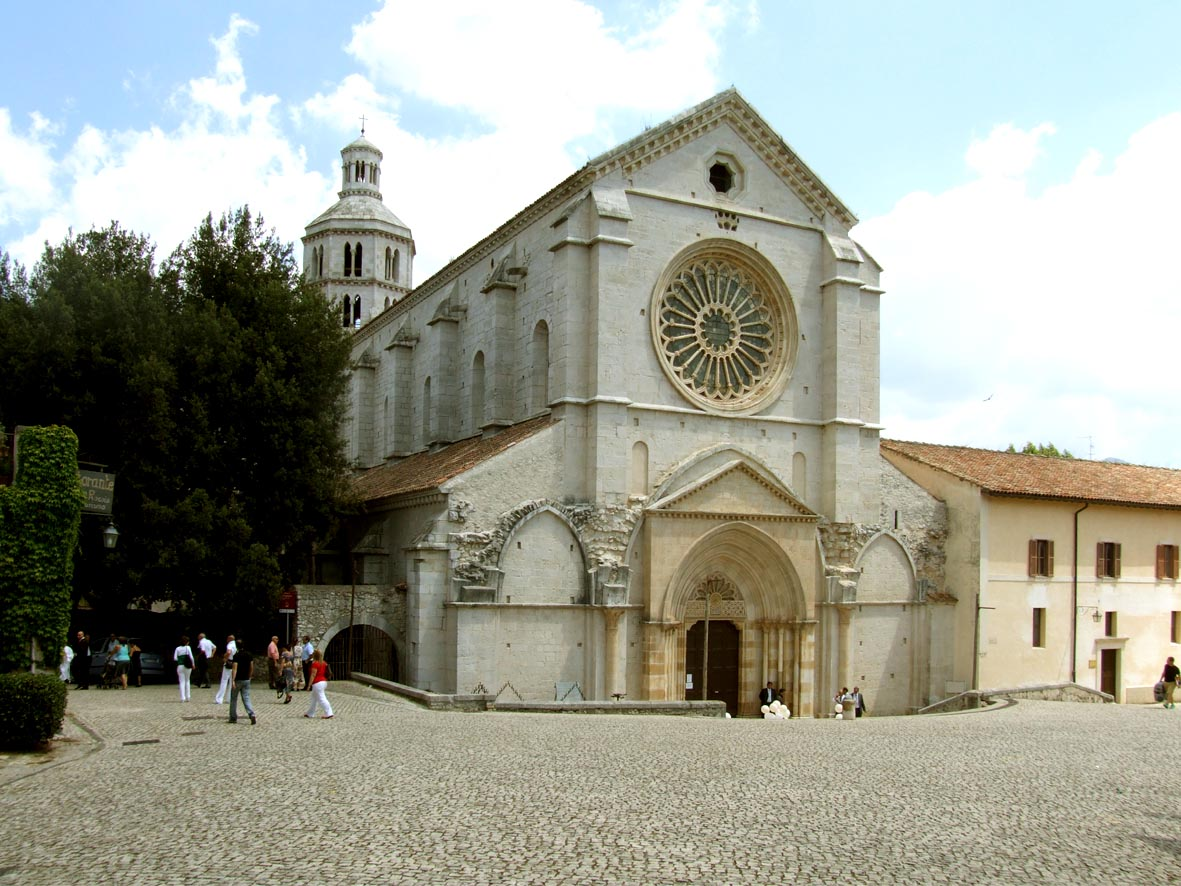
- Abbey of Fossanova

- Location within Italy

Monastery information
- Order: Cistercian
- Established: 1135

Site
- Location: Fossanova, Italy
- Coordinates: 41°26′17″N 13°11′45″E
- Visible remains: substantial
- Public access: yes

Fossanova Abbey (Italian: Abbazia di Fossanova), earlier Fossa Nuova, is a church that was formerly a Cistercian abbey located near the railway station of Priverno in Latina, Italy, about 100 kilometres (62 miles) south-east of Rome.

== History ==
Fossanova is one of the finest examples of early Burgundian Gothic architecture in Italy, dating to around 1135. Consecrated in 1208 by monks of its motherhouse of Hautecombe, it retains the bare architecture, the magnificent rose window and finely carved capitals, reflecting the prominent role within the area.

In July 1198 Eugenius, the master chamberlain of Apulia and Terra di Lavoro, was ordered by Constance and her son to transfer a land property from the imperial ownership to the Abbey of Fossanova. The property was located near Aversa and its extension was calculated by John Bassus, chamberlain of the Terra di Lavoro.

A monk of Fossanova compiled the Annales Ceccanenses down to 1218. Another historical source for the same temporal extension are the Annales Ceccanenses.

En route to the Second Council of Lyon in 1274, the Dominican scholastic Thomas Aquinas died in the abbey on 7 March.

In 1461 Pope Pius II signed a bull returning to the abbey various properties which had been estranged by the previous abbots. The estate list was compiled by Rodrigo Borgia, nephew of Pope Callixtus III, who was attempting to finance a naval expedition against Turks.

Since 1935 pastoral duties in the local abbey parish were entrusted to the care of Franciscan Friars Conventual (OFMConv.), until 2017. Since 2017, the pastoral care of the abbey and its parish have been entrusted to the fathers of the Institute of the Incarnate Word, with the help of the sisters from the same Religious Family, the Servants of the Lord and the Virgin of Matará, who live in a convent at just a few kilometers.

The 1973 nunsploitation film The Nun and The Devil obtained permission to shoot scenes in Fossanova Abbey by withholding details of the plot.[1]

== Architecture ==
The frugal Gothic church is cruciform and square-ended, similar to that of Casamari and Cîteaux Abbey. The church is flanked on one side by the cloister, along with the refectory and chapter house and on the other side by the cemetery. The nave at Fossanova dates from 1187 and the church was consecrated in 1208.

The other conventual buildings also are noteworthy. The hospital, guesthouse, gardens, and buildings related to the farm are all scattered throughout the walled enclosure. Buttresses are set against the walls but they are small and more like classical pilaster than flying buttress.

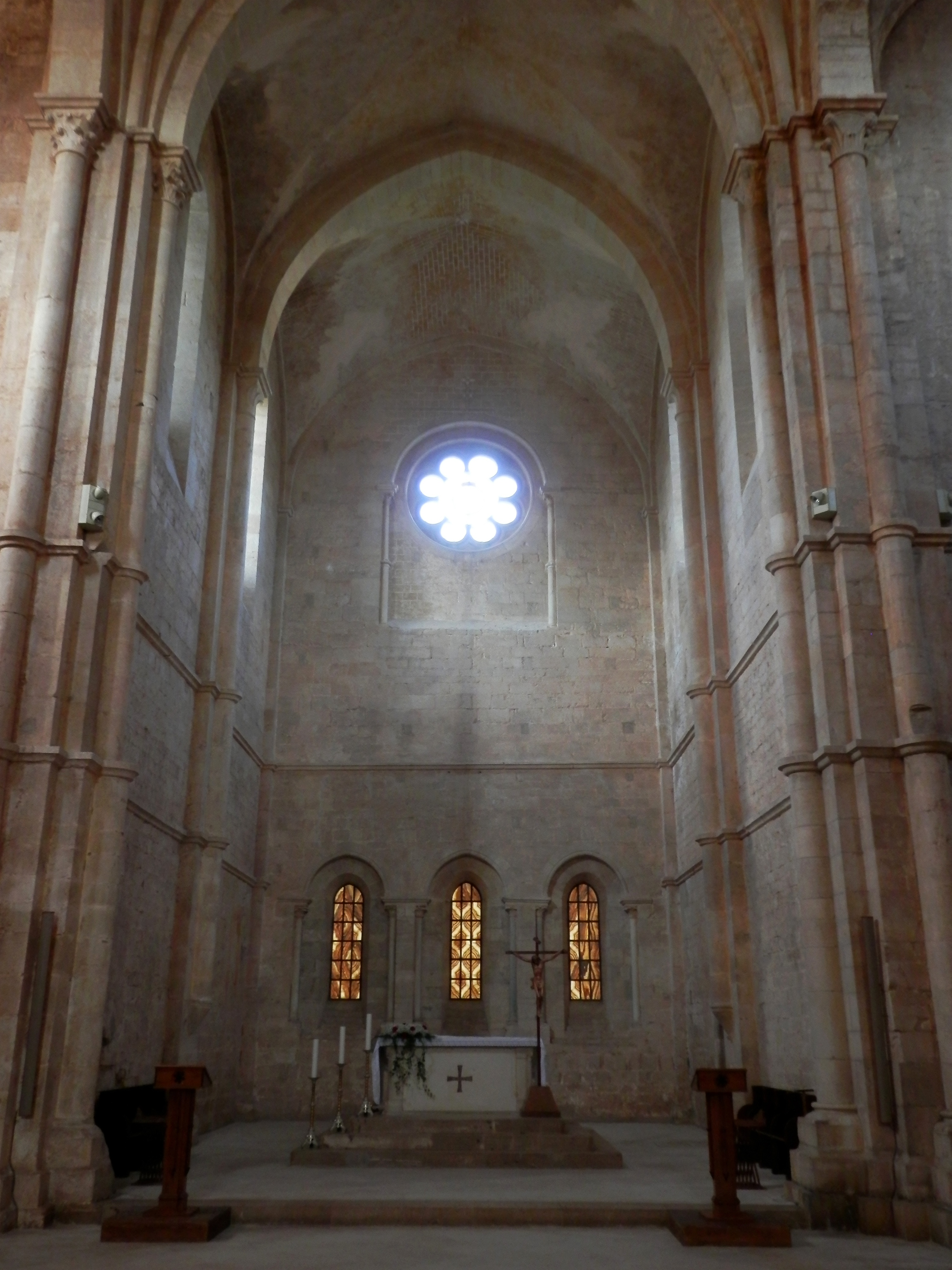
Presbytery of the church

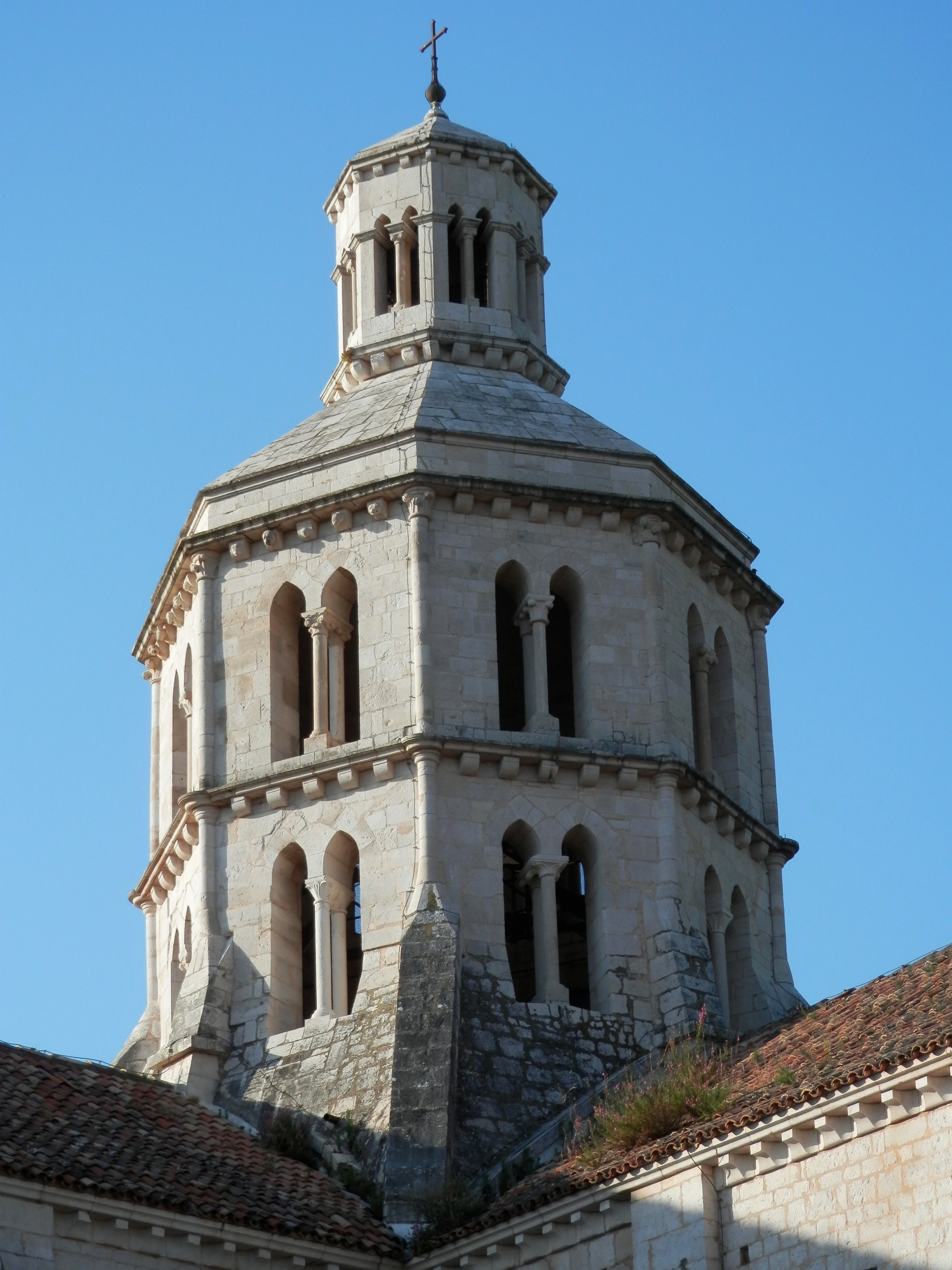
Bell tower

== See also ==
- Hautecombe Abbey
- Italian Gothic architecture
