= Santa Maria a Fiume, Ceccano =

Church building in Ceccano, Italy

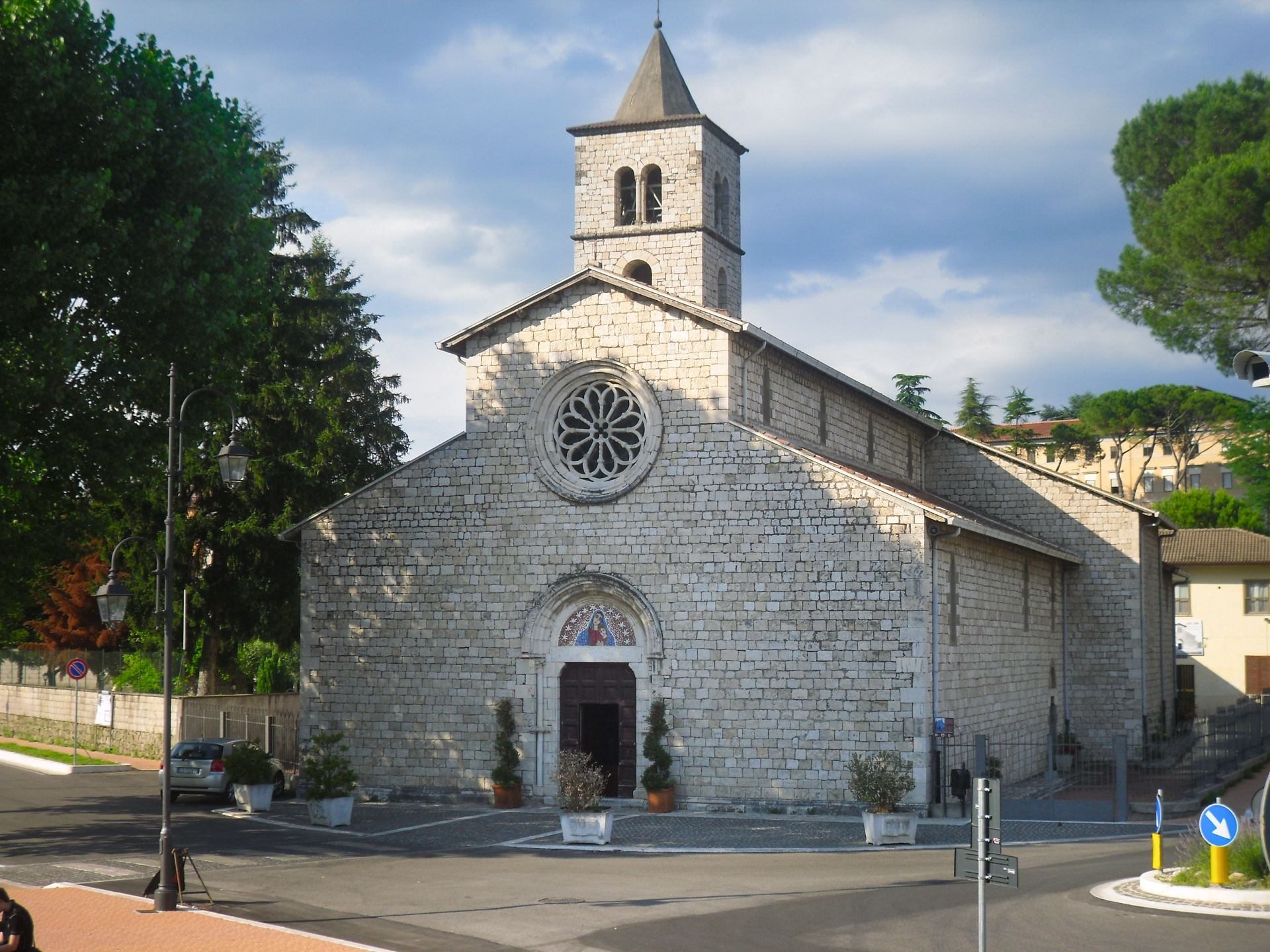
Santuario di Santa Maria a Fiume - Ceccano.jpg

Santa Maria a Fiume is a romanesque-style, Roman Catholic church in the town of Ceccano, province of Frosinone, region of Lazio, Italy.

== History ==
A church at the site was consecrated in 1196, and in the 19th century had been considered a national monument, but a bombardment in 1944 razed the structure. It was reconstructed with as much original material and reconsecrated in 1958. Some of the spolia used in the prior church such as a pulpit and Ancient Roman columns were reused. A medieval wooden statue of the Madonna survived the bombardment. The church is now assigned to the Congregation of Passionisti.
